= List of Maryland music people =

This is a list of Maryland musicians, consisting of Marylanders who are musically notable, with a strong connection to the State of Maryland, USA and others who are notable within the music of Maryland. People listed may be relevant to the state of Maryland, the Province of Maryland or the area now known as Maryland before it was either a state or colony, and may be primarily relevant for reasons not related to music, so long as they do have some musical notability.

This covers specific individuals only. There is a separate list of Maryland music groups.

This list features relevant music people that are:

1. Covered in an academic journal article or book, provided coverage goes beyond mere listing as an example of a broader trend
2. Those documented as having special notability or popularity within the music field and are listed in reputably published sources.

Name	Notes	Reference	Image
Aaron, Dave	Bassist for the Baltimore-based metal band Rancid Decay		
Abbott, Sam	Former mayor of Takoma Park, Maryland, led the creation of the Takoma Park Folk Festival, first held in 1978		
Abadey, Nasar	Teacher at the Peabody Institute, drummer, composer, leader of Supernova and former member of Birthright		
Adams, Harold	Baltimore-area jazz saxophonist		
Addison, Elmer	Jazz saxophonist with the Rivers Chambers Orchestra		
Adler, Peter Herman	Eighth music director of the Baltimore Symphony Orchestra, from 1959 to 1968		
Von Strauss, Barron	Drummer for the Baltimore-based hard progressive metal band Apollo Ra. Arrested in 2012 for cocaine distribution.		
Alsop, Marin	Twelfth, and current, music director of the Baltimore Symphony Orchestra, whose term began in 2007, first woman to head a major American symphony		
Alverson, Mike	Twenty-fourth bandmaster of the United States Naval Academy Band		
Ammen, Mark	Bassist for the Rockville, Maryland-based experimental band Dog Fashion Disco		
Amos, Tori	Pianist and popular singer, youngest student ever to attend the Peabody Institute, at age five		
Adrian, Drew	Guitarist for the Rockville, Maryland-based speed metal band Indestroy		
Antanaitis, Sean	Member of the Baltimore-based rock band Celebration		
Argento, Dominick	Graduate of the Peabody Institute, composer of lyric opera and choral music, winner of the Pulitzer Prize in Music		
Asaro, Catherine	Maryland based vocalist and author		
Ascione, Raymond A.	Nineteenth bandmaster of the United States Naval Academy Band		
Azrael, Sam	Owner of the Super Music Store, an historic venue for African American music in Baltimore		
Bacon, Thomas	Most well-known composer of the Tuesday Club in colonial Annapolis		
Badertscher, Alex	Guitarist for Annapolis-based band Breathing Walker		
Bailey, Earl "Buddy"	Member of the Baltimore-based African American doo wop group The Swallows, best known from their 1950s recordings, not the same individual as the member of The Clovers		
Bailey, Pearl	Singer and actress, originally a chorus girl at The Royal Theatre		
Balthrop, Carmen	Opera singer and winner of the Baltimore Opera Company's vocal competition		
Baker, Hank	Baltimore-area jazz saxophonist		
Baker, Henry	Owner of a men's clothing store in Baltimore that featured rehearsal space that eventually came to host many well-regarded acts		
Banaszkiwicz, Mike	Vocalist for the Baltimore-based speed and power metal band Mystic Force		
Banger, Kid	Drummer (Stephen Toth) for the Baltimore-based metal band Snydly Crunch		
BarenBregge, Peter	Director of the Columbia Jazz Band, writer and record producer with the Airmen of Note		
Barlow, Howard	Fifth music director of the Baltimore Symphony Orchestra, from 1939 to 1942		
Barr, Niki	Denton, Maryland musician best known for entertaining the United States military abroad		
Bartlett, Carol	Current artistic director of the Peabody Institute's dance program, experienced dancer and choreographer, and winner of the Concours Internationale de Chorégraphie		
Bartz, Gary	Baltimore-area jazz saxophonist		
Basiliko, Gus	Drummer for Maryland-based doom metal band Wretched and speed metal band Indestroy		
Bealer, Wiliam	Fifer and one of the best-remembered early members of the United States Naval Academy Band		
Beasley, Sean	Bassist and vocalist for the Annapolis-based death metal band Dying Fetus, former member of Garden of Shadows		
Beck, Allen E.	Eighteenth bandmaster of the United States Naval Academy Band		
Beirs, Benjamin	Teacher at the Peabody Institute's dance program, award-winning guitarist and member of chamber music group Duo Transatlantique		
Bell, Nathan	Former bassist for the Baltimore-area punk band Lungfish		
Belton, Rob	Former drummer for the Annapolis-based death metal band Dying Fetus		
Bender, Leigh	Teacher at the Peabody Institute, trumpeter and composer of the Westminster Symphony Orchestra		
Benteen, Frederick D.	19th-century Baltimore music publisher		
Bergander, David	Drummer for the Baltimore-based rock band Celebration		
Bair, Sheldon	Founder, and subsequent director, of the Susquehanna Symphony Orchestra		
Blake, Eubie	Baltimore native jazz composer, lyricist and performer, pioneer of the stride style		
Bledsoe, John Richard	Seventeenth bandmaster of the United States Naval Academy Band		
Boggs, Matthew	Preparatory faculty at the Peabody Institute and Baltimore area native, double bassist who has toured widely across the United States		
Bonner, Mike	Member of the Annapolis-based punk band The Hated		
Boswell, James	19th-century Baltimore music publisher		
Boudreaux, Margaret	Current director (since 1992) of the McDaniel College Choir		
Bowen, Alvin	Member of the Baltimore-based African American vocal group The Four Buddies		
Bowen, Denny	Drummer for the Baltimore-based rock band Double Dagger and sole member of electronic/mashup project, Smart Growth.		
Boyer, Derek	Former bassist for the Annapolis-based death metal band Dying Fetus		
Branagan, Steve	Drummer for Maryland-based doom metal bands Revelation and Against Nature		
Branigan, Rob	Drummer for the Rockville, Maryland-based speed metal band Indestroy		
Braxton, Tamar	R&B singer from Severn, Maryland, member of The Braxtons		
Braxton, Toni	R&B singer from Severn, Maryland, member of The Braxtons		
Braxton, Towanda	R&B singer from Severn, Maryland, member of The Braxtons		
Braxton, Traci	R&B singer from Severn, Maryland, member of The Braxtons		
Braxton, Trina	R&B singer from Severn, Maryland, member of The Braxtons		
Brenner, Dave	Guitarist for the Baltimore-based metal band Have Mercy		
Brenner, John	Singer and guitarist for Maryland-based doom metal band Revelation		
Brent, Paul A.	Baltimore-area musician who became the first African American to attend the Peabody Institute, in 1949, graduating in 1953		
Brown, Anne	Baltimore native and opera soprano, best known for creating the role of Bess in Porgy and Bess		
Brown, Buster	Jazz guitarist from Albany who joined the Rivers Chambers Orchestra		
Brown, Kev	Rapper and producer from Landover, Maryland, member of the Low Budget collective		
Bryce, Jeffrey	Saxophonist for Annapolis-based rock band the Jarflys		
Bryan, John	Guitarist for the Baltimore-based metal band Have Mercy		
BT	Trance musician from Rockville, Maryland		
Buckler, Casey	Former drummer for the Annapolis-based death metal band Dying Fetus		
Bulkley, Kevin	Guitarist for the Baltimore-based hard progressive metal band Apollo Ra		
Bullock, Mike	Vocalist for the Annapolis-based crossover punk/metal band IronChrist, Rockville based Speed Metal band Indestroy. Guitarist and vocalist for Lanham-based death metal band Scab.		
Burch-Pesses, Michael	Twenty-first bandmaster of the United States Naval Academy Band		
Byers, Matt	Former drummer for the Baltimore-area deathgrind band Misery Index		
Byrne, David	Popular musician and composer, best known with Talking Heads, went to high school at Lansdowne High School and attended the Maryland Institute College of Art		
Calloway, Blanche	One of the first female bandleaders in the United States, from Baltimore		
Calloway, Cab	Jazz singer and bandleader, raised in part in Baltimore		
Callahan Jr, Kevin D	Bassist for the Euro/USA based metal group Them Fuzzy Monsters		
Cameron, Wayne	Teacher at the Peabody Institute, trumpeter and conductor of the UMBC orchestra		
Campbell, Paula	R&B singer from Baltimore		
Carey, Tony	Percussionist for the Baltimore-based psychedelic band The Peppermint Rainbow		
Carmichael, Kelly	Guitarist for Maryland-based doom metal band Internal Void		
Carroll, John "Gregory"	Member of the Baltimore-based African American vocal group The Four Buddies		
Carusi, Samuel	19th-century Baltimore music publisher		
Cassilly, Richard	Graduate of the Peabody Institute and renowned operatic tenor		
Carr, Joseph	Founder of a Baltimore-based music publishing firm		
Carter, William "Tommy"	Member of the Baltimore-based African American vocal group The Four Buddies		
Catbas, Elysabeth	Preparatory faculty at the Peabody Institute, award-winning vocalist		
Chalfant, Jimmy	Drummer for the Hagerstown-based metal band Kix		
Chambers, Rivers	Cellist for the John Ridgely Jazzers, later a fixture in the Baltimore jazz scene and bandleader at The Royal		
Chaney, Jim	Drummer for Annapolis-area rock band Jimmie's Chicken Shack		
Chasez, JC	Singer with 'N Sync, from Bowie, Maryland		
Chestnut, Cyrus	Graduate of the Peabody Institute, jazz musician		
Choe, Jeeyoung Rachel	Teacher at the Peabody Institute, award-winning flautist who has toured across the world		
Chriest, John	Former bassist for the Baltimore-area punk band Lungfish		
Clark, Jon	Drummer for the Baltimore-based rock band 99 Burning		
Clarke, Martha	Graduate of the Peabody Institute, born in Baltimore, renowned choreographer and director		
Cleaveland, Alonzo	Baltimore-based 19th century educator, founder of the Glee School		
Clifton, Arthur	Music publisher and composer		
Coates, Lee	Drummer for the Maryland-based death metal band Exmortis		
Cole, John	19th-century Baltimore music publisher and store owner		
Collette, Calvin	Member of the Baltimore-based African American doo wop group The Swallows, best known from their 1950s recordings		
Collins, Brad	Baltimore-area jazz saxophonist		
Combs, Greg	Guitarist for the Rockville, Maryland-based experimental band Dog Fashion Disco		
Commissiona, Sergiu	Ninth music director of the Baltimore Symphony Orchestra, from 1969 to 1984, also a violinist		
Corrick, Max	Eleventh bandmaster of the United States Naval Academy Band		
Cotto, Orlando	Teacher at the Peabody Institute, well-known percussionist and marimbist		
Coty, Neal	Country singer-songwriter from Maryland		
Cougin	Drummer for Maryland-based doom metal band Wretched		
Covington, Steve	Baltimore-area jazz saxophonist		
Cowell, Henry	Teacher at the Peabody Institute		
Coxsen, Lawrence	Member of the Baltimore-based African American doo wop group The Swallows, best known from their 1950s recordings		
Crawford, Buddy	Member of the Baltimore-based African American doo wop group The Swallows, best known from their 1950s recordings		
Credito, Derrick	Session bassist; guitarist; singer-songwriter for Credito, an indie/folk rock band from Baltimore, Maryland		
Crocco, Matt	Guitarist for the Baltimore-based metal band Rancid Decay		
Crover, Dale	Member of Potomac, Maryland-based doom metal band The Obsessed		
Culos, Christ	Percussionist for Of a Revolution, a jam band from Rockville, Maryland		
Dagher, Joe	Member of Baltimore-based hardcore punk band Law & Order, and then Bollocks		
Dagher, Pete	Member of Baltimore-based hardcore punk band Law & Order, and then Bollocks		
Dagher, William	Member of Baltimore-based hardcore punk band Law & Order, and then Bollocks		
Daglar, Fatma	Teacher at the Peabody Institute, oboist with the Annapolis Symphony Orchestra and the Maryland Symphony Orchestra		
Dailey, Albert	Jazz pianist from Baltimore		
Dale, James A.	Founder of the Annapolis Chorale and assistant music director at the United States Naval Academy		
Danchenko, Victor	Teacher at the Peabody Institute, renowned violinist and winner of both the Ysaye Gold Medal and the Soviet National Competition		
Danchenko-Stern, Vera	Teacher at the Peabody Institute, singer and instrumentalist, and has toured widely across the United States and Russia		
Davis, Rich	Guitarist for the Baltimore-based speed and power metal band Mystic Force		
Dayton, Lee	Vocalist for the Baltimore-based metal band Have Mercy		
Deacon, Dan	Electronic music composer and performer from Baltimore		
Deak, Stephen	Early 20th century founder of the Baltimore Women's String Symphony Orchestra, Wolfgang Martin, from 1936 to 1940		
Deane, Buddy	Host of The Buddy Deane Show, a music television show in Baltimore		
Deems, James Monroe	19th-century composer and music educator from Baltimore		
DeLong, Alfred	Longest-serving and most successful director (1936–1969) of the McDaniel College Choir		
Denby, Herman "Junior"	Member of the Baltimore-based African American doo wop group The Swallows, best known from their 1950s recordings		
Denver, Andrew	Well-regarded drum major in the United States Naval Academy Band in the 1850s		
DePizzo, Jerry	Saxophonist and guitarist for Of a Revolution, a jam band from Rockville, Maryland		
DeVaughn, Raheem	Singer and songwriter, raised in Maryland		
Diehl, Ron	Baltimore-area jazz saxophonist		
DiGalleonardo, Monica	Bassist for Annapolis-based bands Moss Icon and Breathing Walker		
Diggins, Tommy	Along with William Hoeke, the first Marine Musicians of the United States Naval Academy Band		
Divine	Towson, Maryland-born drag actor, best known for Hairspray		
Dixon, Eric	Drummer for the Baltimore-based metal band Rancid Decay		
Dixon, Ike	Owner of the Comedy Club, a major historic music venue in Baltimore		
Dixon, Luther	Member of the Baltimore-based African American vocal group The Buddies		
Dolid, Laura Gurdus	Teacher at the Peabody Institute and founder of Baltimore County Youth Ballet		
Donovan, Caitlin	Teacher at the Peabody Institute and award-winning vocalist		
Dorsey, Derrick	Former bassist for the Annapolis-area rock band Jimmie's Chicken Shack		
Dowling, Dave	Former guitarist for the Annapolis-area rock band Jimmie's Chicken Shack		
Dowsy, Carlos	Clarinetist for the John Ridgely Jazzers		
Dreyfuss, John	Member of Half Japanese, a punk band from Uniontown, Maryland		
Dreyfuss, Ricky	Member of Half Japanese, a punk band from Uniontown, Maryland		
Duncan, Blade	Vocalist for the Baltimore-based hard metal band Hammers Rule		
Dupree, Bubba	Guitarist for Void, a punk band from Columbia, Maryland		
Duritz, Adam	Baltimore born and raised vocalist and songwriter for the pop-rock band, Counting Crows		
Dyer, Samuel	18th-century music publisher in Baltimore		
Heinrich Christian Eisenbrandt	19th century Baltimore brass and woodwind instrument manufacturer		
Ellingson, Nick	Guitarist for the Baltimore-based metal band Have Mercy		
Elliott, Cass	Baltimore-native singer from The Mamas & the Papas		
Elson, Rob	Guitarist and lead songwriter for the Annapolis-area pop punk band The Track Record		
Endicott, Sam	Lead singer of The Bravery, originally from Bethesda, Maryland		
Ennis, Andy	Baltimore-area jazz saxophonist		
Ennis, Ethel	Baltimore-native jazz musician		
Ensminger, John	Percussionist for the Rockville, Maryland-based experimental bands Dog Fashion Disco and Polkadot Cadaver		
Ensminger, Kristen	Trumpeter for the Rockville, Maryland-based experimental band Dog Fashion Disco		
Entrance	Folk musician, real name Guy Blakeslee, former member of The Convocation of...		
Escolopio, Aaron	Originally from Waldorf, Maryland, first drummer for Good Charlotte, now a drummer for Wakefield		
Escolopio, Ryan	Originally from Waldorf, Maryland, guitarist and vocalist for pop-punk band Wakefield		
Eskelin, Ellery	Jazz saxophonist and recording artist, raised in Baltimore		
Ewald, Bryan	Guitarist and vocalist for Annapolis-based rock band the Jarflys		
Maria Ewing	Opera singer and winner of the Baltimore Opera Company's vocal competition		
Fahey, John	Musician from Takoma Park, Maryland		
Faile, Andrew	Guitarist for the Baltimore-based metal band Snydly Crunch		
Fair, David	Member of Half Japanese, a punk band from Uniontown, Maryland		
Fair, Jad	Member of Half Japanese, a punk band from Uniontown, Maryland		
Falkinburg, Bruce	Bassist and vocalist for Potomac, Maryland-based doom metal band The Hidden Hand, also a recording engineer		
Fallon, Neil	Lead singer for Germantown, Maryland-based stoner rock band Clutch		
Feldstein, Mitchell	Drummer for the Baltimore-area punk band Lungfish		
Ferguson, Danny	Member of the Baltimore-based African American vocal group The Buddies		
Ferrara, Tom	Former guitarist for the Baltimore-based rock band Yukon		
Fields, Mickey	The most famous of the Baltimore-area jazz saxophonists, originally of The Tilters		
Finke, Fritz	Former student at the Peabody Institute, founder of the Oratorio Society		
Finnegan, Sean	Drummer for Void, a punk band from Columbia, Maryland		
Fisher, Erik	Member of the Annapolis-based punk band The Hated		
Fisher, Jason	Member of the Annapolis-based punk band The Hated		
Flagg, Lewis	Cellist for the John Ridgely Jazzers		
Fleisher, Leon	Teacher at the Peabody Institute, pianist and first American winner of the Queen Elisabeth International Music Competition of Belgium, in 1952		
Flood, Dale	Guitarist for Maryland-based doom metal bands Wretched and Unorthodox		
Fluck, John D.	Twentieth bandmaster of the United States Naval Academy Band		
Ford, Katrina	Member of the Baltimore-based rock band Celebration		
Formanek, Michael	Teacher at the Peabody Institute, prominent jazz bassist		
Forsythe, Brian	Guitarist for the Hagerstown-based metal band Kix		
Fox, Virgil	Graduate of the Peabody Institute and renowned organist		
France, Al	Member of the Baltimore-based African American doo wop group The Swallows, best known from their 1950s recordings		
Francis, Mike	Bassist for the Maryland-based hard metal band Deuce		
Frank, James	Guitarist for the Baltimore-based rock band 99 Burning		
Frank, Pamela	Teacher at the Peabody Institute, violinist who has toured widely, winner of the Avery Fisher Prize		
Freccia, Massimo	Seventh music director of the Baltimore Symphony Orchestra, from 1952 to 1959		
Friedman, Marty	Guitarist for the Maryland-based hard metal band Deuce		
Fusciello, Zak	Drummer for Annapolis-based band Breathing Walker		
Gaehle, Henry	19th century Baltimore piano manufacturer, cofounder of Wm. Knabe & Co. with William Knabe		
Gaither, Tommy	Guitarist for the pioneering Baltimore-based doo wop group, The Orioles		
Gallagher, John	Guitarist and vocalist for the Annapolis-based death metal band Dying Fetus		
Gambone, Ralph M.	Twenty-third bandmaster of the United States Naval Academy Band		
Ganz, Brian	Teacher at the Peabody Institute, award-winning pianist		
Garcia, Fernando	Guitarist and vocalist for the Baltimore-based metal band Rancid Decay		
Garrett, Sam	Guitarist for the Baltimore-based rock band Yukon		
Gatton, Danny	Guitarist from Newburg, Maryland, who fused blues, rockabilly, jazz, and country to create a musical style he called "redneck jazz". Released several albums, notably, 88 Elmira St.		
Gaster, Jean-Paul	Member of Germantown, Maryland-based stoner rock band Clutch		
Gattis, Tom	Guitarist and vocalist for the Maryland-based hard metal bands Deuce and Tension		
Gebelein, Conrad	longtime band leader at the Johns Hopkins University where a grandstand is named for him. Performed first live music on Baltimore radio station. (1921)		
Geller, Judith	Preparatory faculty at the Peabody Institute, French horn player and arranger for the Charm City Klezmer Band		
Genaux, Vivica	Opera singer and winner of the Baltimore Opera Company's vocal competition		
Gershman, Benj	Bassist for Of a Revolution, a jam band from Rockville, Maryland		
Gidwitz, John	Former president of the Baltimore Symphony Orchestra		
Gilespie, Jon	Keyboardist for Annapolis-based rock band the Jarflys		
Gillett, Wheeler	18th-century music publisher in Baltimore		
Givens, Shirley	Teacher at the Peabody Institute, violinist who has performed across the United States and written numerous instructional violin books		
Glass, Philip	Graduate of the Peabody Institute, minimalist composer		
Glik, Chris	Graduate of the Peabody Institute, composer, keyboardist and vocalist		
Gorden, John	Drummer for the Baltimore-based metal band Have Mercy		
Gray, Alexander	Singing master at St. Anne's Anglican Church in Annapolis, beginning in 1786 and continuing for an unknown amount of time		
Gray, Josh	Frederick, Maryland Folk Musician		
Gray, Julian	Teacher at the Peabody Institute, popular recorded guitarist and author of guitar-related books		
Green, Bus	Bandleader at the Club Orleans		
Green, J. Ernest	Longest-serving director of the Annapolis Chorale, beginning in 1984 and continuing to the present (as of 2008)		
Green, Joseph	Music publisher and printer of the Maryland Gazette in colonial Annapolis, member of the Tuesday Club		
Green-Cudek, Lisa	Preparatory faculty at the Peabody Institute, dance author and lecturer who has appeared on television several times		
Greenberg, Herbert	Teacher at the Peabody Institute, violinist and recording artist for Argo Records who has toured widely and been the subject of national television and radio broadcasts		
Greig, Bruce	Former guitarist for the Baltimore-area deathgrind band Misery Index		
Grist, Ronnie	Bassist for the Maryland-based metal band Kingsbrook		
Grobe, Charles	19th century pianist and composer		
Gross, Mark	Baltimore-area jazz saxophonist		
Guckert, Doug	Drummer for the Baltimore-based speed and power metal band Mystic Force		
Gulli, Ed	Member of Potomac, Maryland-based doom metal band The Obsessed		
Haha, Jimi	Vocalist and singer for Jimmie's Chicken Shack and Jarflys, based in Annapolis		
Hahn, Hilary	Graduate of the Peabody Institute, Grammy Award-winning violinist		
Hahn, Marian	Teacher at the Peabody Institute, award-winning pianist and recording artist		
Hallam, Lewis	Head of the American Company, one of the first opera troupes to perform in Maryland		
Hall, Bert	Bassist for Maryland-based doom metal band Revelation and Against Nature		
Hall, Chris	Bassist for the Maryland-based hard metal band Deuce		
Hamerik, Asger	Danish composer who became the director of the Peabody Institute		
Hall II, Robert Bryson	Gaithersburg raised rapper who goes by his stage name Logic. Currently signed with Visionary Music Group and Def Jam Records.		
Hamilton, Alexander	Founder of the Tuesday Club, a social society which featured music at its meetings in colonial Annapolis		
Hammer, Charles	Cornetist and second bandmaster of the United States Naval Academy Band		
Hampshire, Rob	Bassist for the Maryland-based doom metal band Earthride		
Harris, Charles L.	Founder of the Baltimore Colored Chorus and Baltimore Colored Symphony Orchestra, both in 1929, and led the Baltimore Colored City Band, also teacher of organ and cornet		
Harris, Skip	Bassist for the Baltimore-based psychedelic band The Peppermint Rainbow		
Harrison, Leon "Larry"	Member of the Baltimore-based African American vocal groups The Four Buddies and The Buddies		
Harrison, Michael	Current General Director for the Baltimore Opera Company		
Harrison, Mike	Former guitarist and vocalist for the Baltimore-area deathgrind band Misery Index		
Hart, Antonio	Baltimore-area jazz saxophonist		
Hart, Josh	Guitarist for Maryland-based doom metal band Revelation, formerly of Unorthodox		
Hartz, Ted	Guitarist for the Maryland-based death metal band Exmortis		
Hean, Casey	Guitarist for the Annapolis-area rock band Jimmie's Chicken Shack		
Heinzmann, Adam	Bassist for Maryland-based doom metal band Internal Void		
Henderson, Brice	Nashville singer - songwriter. One of Billboard Magazine's Top Ten New Country Artists 1983.		
Hendricks, Bobby	Member of the Baltimore-based African American doo wop group The Swallows, best known from their 1950s recordings		
Henley, Shaun	Bassist for the Baltimore-based hard metal band Hammers Rule		
Hennesey, David	Original drummer for Potomac, Maryland-based doom metal band The Hidden Hand		
Hersch, Michael	Teacher at the Peabody Institute, award-winning composer whose works have been widely performed		
Hewitt, John Hill	Baltimore-based 19th century educator, co-founder of the Musical Institute, with William Stoddard		
Hicks, Bobby	Vocalist for the Baltimore-based speed and power metal band Mystic Force		
Hicks, Maurice	Member of the Baltimore-based African American vocal group The Four Buddies		
Higgs, Daniel	Vocalist, member of Reptile House and Lungfish		
Hildebrand, David K.	Professor at the Peabody Conservatory, nationally regarded music historian specializing in early American music, especially in Maryland. Performer and recording artist of colonial period music.		
Hill, Kenny	Member of the Annapolis-based punk band The Hated, and the Spastic Rats, and founder of Vermin Scum, a local record label		
Hoeke, William	Along with Tommy Diggins, the first Marine Musicians of the United States Naval Academy Band		
Hohn, Chuck	Drummer for the Baltimore-based hard metal band Hammers Rule		
Holiday, Billie	Pioneering jazz singer who spent much of her childhood in Baltimore, known for an emotional and intimate vocal technique		
Holbrook, Jay	Former General Director for the Baltimore Opera Company		
Holloway, Ron	Tenor saxophonist known for performing in several genres of music. Holloway has worked with Susan Tedeschi, Dizzy Gillespie, Gil Scott-Heron and Root Boy Slim. He has shared the stage with Gov't Mule, The Allman Brothers Band, Little Feat, Derek Trucks, Taj Mahal (musician), Widespread Panic and Carlos Santana.		
Hong, Ah	Teacher at the Peabody Institute, acclaimed vocalist who has performed extensively, and been the subject of an internationally broadcast radio performance		
Horner, Tim	Violinist for Annapolis-based band Breathing Walker		
Howland, Keith	Guitarist from Silver Spring, Maryland, member of Chicago		
Huber, Fred	Director of Municipal Music in the early 20th century, dictated repertoire to municipally supported bands and banned jazz		
Hughes, Alfred	Saxophonist for the John Ridgely Jazzers		
Hunter, Jim	Former member of Maryland-based doom metal band		
Hurley, Earl	Member of the Baltimore-based African American doo wop group The Swallows, best known from their 1950s recordings		
Brandt Huseman	Bassist for the 1990s power pop band The Greenberry Woods and Splitsville		
Huseman, Matt	Songwriter for the 1990s power pop band The Greenberry Woods and Splitsville		
Inglefield, Ruth	Teacher at the Peabody Institute, harpist and author of numerous articles and books		
Irvine, John	Member of the Annapolis-based punk band The Hated		
Irwin, Julienne	Bel Air, Maryland-born singer who was a finalist on America's Got Talent		
Isom, Gary	Drummer for Potomac, Maryland-based doom metal and stoner metal band Spirit Caravan, Internal Void, Nitroseed, Pentagram, Valkyrie and Unorthodox		
Itzel, Adam Jr.	19th-century composer and conductor		
Jackson, George	Lead singer for the Baltimore-based African American doo wop group, with J&S Records, from the 1950s, with a solo career in the 1960s		
James, Chris W.	Edgewood, Maryland Musician and author. Americana folk artist Most notably for Big Poppa Pump's Entrance theme, Steinerlined. Also, movie soundtracks Dangerous Mode, China Dolls, Darkest Soul and creator of the Savvy marketing series, taught Savvy Marketing for Musicians at Harford Community College. Seen with Richard Branson Virgin Records		
Werner Janssen	Fourth music director of the Baltimore Symphony Orchestra, from 1937 to 1939, also a composer		
Jarvis, Adam	Drummer for the Baltimore-area deathgrind band Misery Index		
Jickling, Mark	Member of Half Japanese, a punk band from Uniontown, Maryland		
Jarvis, John	Drummer and one of the best-remembered early members of the United States Naval Academy Band		
Jett, Joan	Rock musician, founder of The Runaways and Joan Jett & the Blackhearts; grew up in Rockville, Maryland		
Johnson, Carlos	Baltimore-area jazz saxophonist		
Johnson, Frederick	Member of the Baltimore-based African American doo wop group The Swallows, best known from their 1950s recordings		
Johnson, Money	Member of the Baltimore-based African American doo wop group The Swallows, best known from their 1950s recordings		
Jones, Junetta	Award-winning soprano and one of the first African American students at the Peabody Institute, and first to earn the Artist's Diploma, helped to found the Baltimore Municipal Orchestra		
Jones, Matt	Guitarist and vocalist for the Annapolis-area rock band Jimmie's Chicken Shack		
Josephson, Kim	Opera singer and winner of the Baltimore Opera Company's vocal competition		
Joy, Tonie	Guitarist for Annapolis-based bands Moss Icon and Breathing Walker, later founding Universal Order of Armageddon and The Convocation of... and briefly joining Born Against		
Jungnickel, Ross	Founder of the first Baltimore Symphony Orchestra, which ceased to exist in 1899		
Kalimon, Ronnie	Former member of Maryland-based doom metal bands Unorthodox and Internal Void		
Kane, Martin "Kim"	Former member of Maryland-based garage bands The Slickee Boys and Date Bait		
Kannen, Michael	Teacher at the Peabody Institute, award-winning chamber music performer		
Karatz, Frank	Guitarist for the Maryland-based metal band Kingsbrook		
Katz, Ira	Songwriter for the 1990s power pop band The Greenberry Woods		
Keith, Steve	Annapolis-based popular folk musician		
Keller, Donald H. Jr.	Twenty-fifth bandmaster of the United States Naval Academy Band		
Kennedy, John Pendleton	Secretary of the Navy who requested the establishment of the United States Naval Academy Band in 1852		
Kennedy, Seamus	Nationally renowned performer and recording artist of Celtic music	Scooter Smiff -Rapper/Baltimore's best	
Kenner, Kevin	Graduate of the Peabody Institute, bronze medal winner at the International Tchaikovsky Competition, top prize winner in the International Frédéric Chopin Piano Competition and winner of the Polonaise Prize		
Kernan, James L.	Founder of the Maryland Theater of Baltimore		
Kerr, T. Henderson	Orchestra leader, violinist and composer in the early 20th century		
Kessler, Melvin Paul	Twenty-sixth bandmaster of the United States Naval Academy Band		
Key, Francis Scott	Maryland attorney and author of "The Star-Spangled Banner", the national anthem of the United States of America		
Greg Kihn	Pop singer and radio personality from Baltimore, frontman for The Greg Kihn Band		
Kim, Christine	Preparatory faculty at the Peabody Institute, award-winning pianist		
Kimball, Mike	Guitarist and songwriter for the Annapolis-based death metal band Dying Fetus		
Kloeppel, Mark	Guitarist and vocalist for the Baltimore-area deathgrind band Misery Index		
Knabe, Ernest	19th century Baltimore piano manufacturer of his father's firm, Wm. Knabe & Co.		
Knabe, William M. (Sr.)	19th century Baltimore piano manufacturer, founder of Wm. Knabe & Co.		
Knabe, William (Jr.)	19th century Baltimore piano manufacturer of his father's firm, Wm. Knabe & Co.		
Knoerlein, John	Drummer for the Baltimore-based metal band Have Mercy		
Knopp, Seth	Teacher at the Peabody Institute, award-winning pianist and chamber musician who has toured widely and recorded		
Koutsioukis, John	Bassist for Maryland-based doom metal bands Unorthodox and Wretched		
Kozinska, Alina	Preparatory faculty at the Peabody Institute, award-winning vocalist who has toured widely and appeared on television in several countries		
Kranz, G. Fred	19th-century Baltimore music publisher		
Kremer, Andy	Bassist for the Maryland-based doom metal band Revelation		
Kulesza, JoAnn	Teacher at the Peabody Institute, award-winning opera singer who has performed and conducted across the United States		
Lambros, Maria	Teacher at the Peabody Institute, nominated for the Grammy Award for Best Chamber Music Performance, recorded and performed widely		
Lamdin, Bonnie	Vocalist for the Baltimore-based psychedelic band The Peppermint Rainbow		
Lamdin, Pat	Vocalist for the Baltimore-based psychedelic band The Peppermint Rainbow		
Lande, Irina Kaplan	Founding member of the Poulenc Trio. Preparatory faculty at the Peabody Institute, award-winning pianist who has toured across Europe and released recordings on the Marquis Classics and Delos labels. Artistic Director of Candlelight Concert Society in Columbia, MD.		
Larkins, Ellis	First African American to attend the Peabody Institute, jazz pianist originally with the Baltimore City Colored Orchestra		
Larson, Nathan	Film scorer, composer and member of Shudder to Think and Hot One, from Maryland		
Latta, Brian	Guitarist for the Annapolis-based death metal band Dying Fetus		
Laue, Mark	Member of Potomac, Maryland-based doom metal band The Obsessed		
Laurence, Mark	Drummer for Annapolis-based bands Moss Icon and Breathing Walker		
Lawson, James	Baritone for the Baltimore-based African American doo wop group, with J&S Records, from the 1950s		
Lee, Rod	Baltimore-based DJ, innovator of Baltimore club		
Legrand, Victoria	Vocalist and organist for the indie rock duo Beach House from Baltimore		
Leiber, Jerry	Songwriter, born in 1933 in Baltimore		
Lembach, Steve	Drummer for the Baltimore-based speed and power metal band Mystic Force		
Lemon, Che Colavita	Former bassist for the Annapolis-area rock band Jimmie's Chicken Shack		
Leter, Steve	Bassist for the Maryland-based hard metal band Deuce		
Lewis, Doug	Guitarist for the Baltimore-based psychedelic band The Peppermint Rainbow		
Little, Eric	Drummer for Maryland-based doom metal band Earthride, and former member of Internal Void		
Lindsay, Adam	Founder of the Maryland Company of Comedians, the first resident theatre company in Baltimore		
Littleton, Daniel	Member of the Annapolis-based punk band The Hated		
Lockwood, Henry	Professor of natural philosophy at the United States Naval Academy, commander of the Academy's first dress parade, in 1848, which featured local musicians		
Lofgren, Nils	Multi-instrumentalist raised in Bethesda, Maryland, known as guitarist/keyboardist with Neil Young and Bruce Springsteen and the E Street Band. Lofgren's solo career and songwriting led to being honored with his own "day" in Maryland.		
Loggins, Tee	Musician with the Rivers Chambers Orchestra		
Long, Carolyn	Opera singer and graduate of the Peabody Institute, born in Cambridge, Maryland		
Louie, Gary	Teacher at the Peabody Institute, saxophonist who has performed and recorded extensively		
Louis, Sammy	Jazz bandleader at The Ritz, whose band toured widely in the region in the 1930s		
Luke, Katherine	Organizer of the Handel Choir of Baltimore in 1935		
Maguire, Hugh	Singing master at St. Anne's Anglican Church in Annapolis, beginning in 1765		
MacDonald, A. T. Michael	Teacher at the Peabody Institute, recording engineer who has worked with many major labels		
Mack, Ellen	Teacher at the Peabody Institute, pianist who has recorded and performed throughout Europe, Russia and North America		
Mack, Norris "Bunky"	Member of the Baltimore-based African American doo wop group The Swallows, best known from their 1950s recordings		
Madden, Benji	Originally from Waldorf, Maryland, guitarist and backup vocalist from pop-punk band Good Charlotte		
Madden, Joel	Originally from Waldorf, Maryland, lead singer from pop-punk band Good Charlotte		
Maffeo, Jerome	Drummer for the Annapolis-area rock band Jimmie's Chicken Shack		
Maines, Dan	Member of Germantown, Maryland-based stoner rock band Clutch		
Maness, Mike	Drummer for the Maryland-based metal band Kingsbrook		
Mantis, Jason	Vocalist for the Baltimore-based metal band Rancid Decay		
Marbury, William	Former chairmen of the Board of Trustees of the Peabody Institute, led the charge to admit African Americans to the Peabody in 1949		
Maphis, Rose Lee	Country music vocalist and guitarist duo with husband Joe Maphis		
Marlin, Miles	Bassist for the Baltimore-based band Hammers Rule		
Mario	Baltimore-based R&B singer		
Marshall, William F.	Fourth bandmaster of the United States Naval Academy Band, who expanded the Band's size greatly and was the first bandmaster to not be officially credited as an instrumentalist		
Martin, Billy	Originally from Severna Park, Maryland, keyboardist and guitarist from pop-punk band Good Charlotte		
Martin, Hasani	Drummer for the Annapolis-area pop punk band The Track Record		
Martin, Wolfgang	Early 20th century founder of the Baltimore Women's String Symphony Orchestra, with Stephen Deak, from 1936 to 1940		
Massey, Edith	Actress and singer who appeared in films by John Waters		
Massey, Kevin	Bassist for the Baltimore-based metal band Rancid Decay		
Mastrian, Stacey	Teacher at the Peabody Institute, award-winning soprano vocalist, specializing in Italian singing		
Matthews, Vince	Former vocalist for the Annapolis-based death metal band Dying Fetus		
Maw, Nicholas	Teacher at the Peabody Institute, award-winning composer whose works have been widely performed		
Maxwell, Tom	Guitarist for the Baltimore-based metal band Have Mercy		
May, London	Member of Reptile House, Lungfish and Samhain		
McAbee, Ruth Lee	Soprano who performed with the Baltimore City Colored Orchestra at its 1931 debut		
McDowell, Steve	Tenor for the Baltimore-based African American doo wop group, with J&S Records, from the 1950s		
McCallum, Audrey Cyrus	Pianist, and the first African American to attend the Peabody Preparatory, in 1955		
McCleary, Tracy	Pianist and classically trained musicians, later a conductor at The Royal in Baltimore with his band, the Royal Men of Rhythm		
McComas, Brian	Country singer-songwriter from Bethesda, Maryland		
McCombs, Cass	Musician who lived in Baltimore for a period		
McCoy, Donvonté	Teacher at the Peabody Institute, jazz trumpeter who has performed widely, member of New Soil and the Donvonté McCoy Quintet		
McCoy, Roy	Jazz trumpeter		
McDonough, Jim	Former guitarist for Annapolis-area rock band Jimmie's Chicken Shack		
McIntosh, Tom	Graduate of the Peabody Institute and Baltimore native, jazz trombonist and composer		
McTierney, Michele	Singer-songwriter, musician for the Baltimore-based Shock/Nu/Goth Metal band Sans Peur, rock band The Whiskeys, solo artist, vocal coach and owner/president of Accent E Entertainment LLC		
McKeown, Bill	Guitarist for the Baltimore-based hard progressive metal band Apollo Ra		
Meadows, Sean	Bassist for the Baltimore-area punk band Lungfish		
Meadows, Timmy	Guitarist for the Maryland-based hard metal bands Deuce and Tension, and brother of Angel's Punky Meadows		
Mears, Stephen	Bassist for the Rockville, Maryland-based experimental band Dog Fashion Disco		
Mechlin, Spunki	Guitarist for the Baltimore-based hard metal band Hammers Rule		
Meeder, Colin	Member of the Annapolis-based punk band The Hated		
Melton, Larry	Bassist for the Annapolis-based rock band the Jarflys		
Mencken, H. L.	Author who founded the Wednesday Club, and member of the Florestan Club, both influential organizations in Baltimore music history		
Menser, Keith	Bassist for the Baltimore-based speed and power metal band Mystic Force		
Menser, Scott	Vocalist for the Baltimore-based speed and power metal band Mystic Force		
Metcalf, Thomas E.	Twenty-second bandmaster of the United States Naval Academy Band		
Meyer, G. J.	Third bandmaster of the United States Naval Academy Band		
Meyerhoff, Joseph	Influential former president of the Baltimore Symphony Orchestra		
Michael, Rob	Bassist for the Baltimore-based metal bands Have Mercy and Museum (originally known as Rancid Decay)		
Miller, Dan	Vocalist for the Baltimore-based hard progressive metal band Apollo Ra		
Moon, Yong Hi	Teacher at the Peabody Institute, award-winning pianist		
Moore, Billy	Jazz guitarist		
Moore, Lenny	Football player, of the Baltimore Colts, later owner of the Sportsmen's Lounge, a prominent jazz venue in Baltimore in the 1960s		
Morris, Alfred III	Frontman for doom metal band Iron Man, based in Maryland		
Morgan, Janet	Bassist for the Baltimore-based rock band, Channels		
Morris, Alexander Cecil	Tenth bandmaster of the United States Naval Academy Band when it first performed on television		
Morris, Charles	Chief of the Bureau of Ordnance and Hydrography, authorized and funded the United States Naval Academy Band in 1852		
Morris, James	Renowned opera singer and winner of the Baltimore Opera Company's vocal competition		
Moulis, Matt	Drummer for Potomac, Maryland-based doom metal band The Hidden Hand		
Muckenfuss, Robert	Teacher at the Peabody Institute, singer and vocal coach of many years, organist and recording artist		
Muffley, Ned E.	Fifteenth bandmaster of the United States Naval Academy Band when it first integrated women in the 1970s		
Murphy, Kevin	Former drummer for the Annapolis-area rock band Jimmie's Chicken Shack		
Murphy, Timothy	Teacher at the Peabody Institute, jazz pianist who has recorded and performed widely		
Mýa	Singer, producer and actress from Greenbelt, Maryland		
Nabokov, Nicholas	Teacher at the Peabody Institute		
Nadler, Shelia	Opera singer and winner of the Baltimore Opera Company's vocal competition		
Needleman, Katherine	Teacher at the Peabody Institute, accomplished oboist and native of Baltimore		
Nelson, George	Baritone of pioneering Baltimore-based doo wop group, The Orioles		
Netherton, Jason	Bassist and vocalist for the Baltimore-based deathgrind band Misery Index, formerly with the Annapolis-based death metal band Dying Fetus		
Newsom, Tommy	Graduate of the Peabody Institute, saxophonist on The Tonight Show Starring Johnny Carson		
Novo, José-Luis	Current conductor of the Annapolis Symphony Orchestra		
O'Connor, Tim	Bassist for the Maryland-based speed metal band Tension		
Ocasek, Ric	Lead vocalist and songwriter for The Cars; grew up in Baltimore		
Oliver, Mike	Drummer for the Rockville, Maryland-based experimental band Dog Fashion Disco		
On, Richard	Guitarist for Of a Revolution, a jam band from Rockville, Maryland		
Osborne, Asa	Guitarist for the Baltimore-area punk band Lungfish		
Ott, David	Composer of the Annapolis Overture on behalf of the Annapolis Symphony Orchestra		
Otte, Jim	Drummer for the Baltimore-based speed and power metal band Mystic Force		
Page, Johnny	Singer with the African American doo wop group The Marylanders		
Page, Kenneth W.	Founder of the Annapolis Symphony Orchestra and civil rights leader		
Palanker, Edward	Teacher at the Peabody Institute, clarinetist and bass clarinetist who has recorded and performed widely and authored several articles for the International Clarinet Journal		
Palmer, Vernon "Bert"	Member of the Baltimore-based African American vocal group The Four Buddies		
Parker, Harlan D.	Faculty at the Peabody Institute, conductor of the Peabody Wind Ensemble, who have performed and recorded to great acclaim		
Parris, Mikel	Keyboardist and percussionist for Of a Revolution, a jam band from Rockville, Maryland		
Parsons, Jeff	Guitarist for Maryland-based doom metal bands Wretched, Indestroy and Unorthodox		
Pasternack, Benjamin	Faculty at the Peabody Institute, award-winning pianist		
Patterson, Donald Dean	Fourteenth bandmaster of the United States Naval Academy Band		
Peabody, George	Philanthropist and founder of the Peabody Institute in Baltimore		
Peterman, H. J.	Eighth bandmaster of the United States Naval Academy Band		
Peters, W. C.	19th-century Baltimore music publisher		
Pfanstiehl, Eliot	President and CEO of the Strathmore		
Pfeiffer, John Philip	First bandmaster of the United States Naval Academy Band		
Phillips, Mike	Drummer for Maryland-based doom metal bands Unorthodox and Wretched		
Phillips, William J.	Composer and sixteenth bandmaster of the United States Naval Academy Band		
Pinhas, Guy	Member of Potomac, Maryland-based doom metal band The Obsessed		
Plishka, Paul	Opera singer and winner of the Baltimore Opera Company's vocal competition		
Podgurski, Nick	Percussionist for the Baltimore-based rock band Yukon		
Pollauf, Jacqueline	Classical harpist and teacher based in Baltimore harp		
Pomeroy, Robert	Manager of the Lyric Opera in Baltimore when it began allowing African American performers in 1968		
Ponselle, Rosa	Renowned opera soprana, first artistic director of the Baltimore Opera Company		
Porter, David Dixon	Superintendent at the Naval Academy who modernized and professionalized the United States Naval Academy Band		
Post, Marjorie Merriweather	American socialite, businesswoman, owner of General Foods, namesake of the Merriweather Post Pavilion		
Prankster, Mary	Formerly Baltimore-based indie rock singer-songwriter		
Pratt, Awadagin	Graduate of the Peabody Institute and the first student to graduate with degrees in three performance areas, prominent concert pianist and violinist, winner of the Naumburg International Piano Competition		
Prettyman, Edward	Leader of the Baltimore Colored Park Band		
Puciato, Greg	Singer of The Dillinger Escape Plan, originally from Baltimore		
Purnell, Donnie	Bassist for the Hagerstown-based metal band Kix		
Purviance, Ernest	Popular Baltimore-based jazz musician, later with the Drexel Jazz Syncopaters		
Puts, Kevin	Teacher at the Peabody Institute, award-winning composer		
Quigley, Sennen	Guitarist and keyboardist for the Rockville, Maryland-based experimental band Dog Fashion Disco		
Randall, James Ryder	Author of "Maryland, My Maryland", written in 1861		
Randolph, Harold	Former director of the Peabody Institute		
Reds, Detroit	Performer at the Merry-Go-Round on Pennsylvania Avenue, later master of ceremonies for Club Orleans		
Reed, Johnny	Double bass and bass vocalist of pioneering Baltimore-based doo wop group, The Orioles		
Reeder, Scott	Member of Potomac, Maryland-based doom metal band The Obsessed		
Reinagle, Alexander	Composer, manager, with Thomas Wignell of the Holliday Street Theater, one of the most important venues of colonial Baltimore		
Rice, Chris	Maryland-native Christian contemporary music songwriter		
Rich, Eddie	Member of Baltimore-based African American vocal group The Swallows		
Richards, Chuck	Popular African American radio personality with WBAL in the mid-20th century		
Ricketts, Michael	Recording artist and co-founder and lead guitarist for the Baltimore-based metal band Snydly Crunch		
Ridgely, John	Founder of the first band, the John Ridgley Jazzers, to call its music jazz in Baltimore		
Rippetoe, Matt	Horn player for the Rockville, Maryland-based experimental band Dog Fashion Disco		
Ritchie, Phil	Singer with the band Lennex, from Ocean City, Maryland		
Robbins, J.	Frontman for the Baltimore-based rock band, Channels, and formerly of Burning Airlines and Jawbox		
Roberge, Marc	Vocalist and guitarist for Of a Revolution, a jam band from Rockville, Maryland		
Roberts, Gwyn	Teacher at the Peabody Institute, recorder-player who has recorded widely		
Robinson, Ann	Maryland-born colonial era theater owner in Augusta, Georgia, originally married to Dennis Ryan, manager of the Maryland Company of Comedians		
Rochester, Joseph T. H.	Popular Baltimore-based jazz musician and bandleader, later with the Drexel Jazz Syncopaters		
Rod, DJ Roddy	Maryland-based DJ and member of hip hop group Maspyke and the Low Budget collective		
Rogers, Maggie	American singer-songwriter and record producer from Easton, Maryland.		
Rogers, Greg	Member of Potomac, Maryland-based doom metal band The Obsessed		
Romasco, Matt	Maryland-based Designer and Tube Guitar Amplifier builder JMJAmps.com		
Rosen, Miles	Drummer for the 1990s power pop band The Greenberry Woods		
Rothschild, Rudolph	Co-founder of the Baltimore Chamber Music Society in 1950		
Rouchard, Marc	Guitarist for the Baltimore-based speed and power metal band Mystic Force		
Rowe, Devonna	Preparatory faculty at the Peabody Institute, award-winning vocalist who has toured internationally		
Rowe, Mike	American narrator and TV personality, former professional singer with the Baltimore Opera Company		
Ruthvin, Joe	Former member of the Maryland-based doom metal band Earthride		
Ryan, Dennis	Manager of the first theatrical company in Baltimore in the 1780s		
Saelzer, Pablo	Conductor of the Maryland Classic Youth Orchestras' Sinfonia, and a well-known conductor with other institutions both in his native Chile and the United States		
Sayenga, Eric	Former drummer for the Annapolis-based death metal band Dying Fetus		
Scally, Alex	Guitarist and keyboardist for the indie rock duo Beach House from Baltimore		
Schauer, Mick	Member of Germantown, Maryland-based stoner rock band Clutch		
Schelling, Ernest	Third music director of the Baltimore Symphony Orchestra, from 1935 to 1937, also a pianist and composer		
Schock, Gina	Drummer for The Go-Go's, originally from Baltimore		
Schoff, Peter	Fifth bandmaster of the United States Naval Academy Band		
Schoolden, Mike	From Waldorf, Maryland, guitarist for pop-punk band Wakefield		
Schulze, Elizabeth	Second Music Director of the Maryland Symphony Orchestra in Hagerstown		
Sentelle, Larry	Guitarist for the Maryland-based metal band Kingsbrook		
Shaffer, Steve	Guitarist for the Baltimore-based speed and power metal band Mystic Force		
Shakur, Tupac	Gangsta rapper who lived in Baltimore for a time		
Sharp, Alexander	High tenor of pioneering Baltimore-based doo wop group, The Orioles		
Sharp, William	Teacher at the Peabody Institute, critically acclaimed singer who has recorded for several labels and was nominated for the Grammy Award for Best Classical Music Performance		
Shaw, Ruel	Baltimore-based 19th century education and music publisher		
Sherman, Dave	Bassist and vocalist for Potomac, Maryland-based doom metal and stoner metal band Spirit Caravan, and Wretched and Earthride		
Shirley-Quirk, John	Teacher at the Peabody Institute, critically acclaimed singer who has recorded prolifically and won several Grammy Awards		
Siegel, Jeff	Keyboardist for the Rockville, Maryland-based experimental band Dog Fashion Disco		
Siemonn, George	Second music director of the Baltimore Symphony Orchestra, from 1930 to 1935		
Sima, William	Ninth director of the United States Naval Academy Band, composer of the "Victory March"		
Simons, Mike	Original vocalist for the Maryland-based death metal band Exmortis		
Sipple, Mike	Former drummer for the Annapolis-area rock band Jimmie's Chicken Shack		
Sisqó	R&B singer from Baltimore		
Sissle, Noble	Baltimore jazz musician and composer who worked with Eubie Blake		
Slayter, Gayle	Popular vocalist with the United States Naval Academy Band		
Slot Racer	Baltimore-based indie rock band		
Slutsky, Boris	Teacher at the Peabody Institute, award-winning pianist		
Smail, Mike	Drummer for Maryland-based doom metal band Internal Void		
Smith, Brad	Bassist for the Baltimore-based rock band Yukon		
Smith, David	Baltimore-area jazz saxophonist		
Smith, Jimmy	Baltimore-area organist, known for his work on the Hammond B-3 organ		
Smith, Jordan Randall	Baltimore-area conductor, founder of Symphony Number One		
Smith, Todd	Vocalist and guitarist, member the Rockville, Maryland-based experimental bands Dog Fashion Disco (vocals) and Polkdadot Cadaver (vocals and guitar)		
Snowden, Elmer	Baltimore-native jazz banjoist		
Solars, Elizabeth Faidley	Preparatory faculty at the Peabody Institute, winner of the Melissa Tiller Memorial Prize for String Performance		
Southard, Lucien	Conductor the Peabody Institute		
Speleos, Nick	Guitarist and vocalist for the Annapolis-based death metal band Dying Fetus		
Spence, Donnie	Drummer for the Hagerstown-based metal band Kix		
Spetta, Michael	Vocalist for the Baltimore-based metal band Snydly Crunch		
Spiegel, Sam	DJ, originally from Bethesda, Maryland, also known as Squeak E. Clean		
Spice Caravan	Doom metal and stoner metal band from Potomac, Maryland, led by Scott Weinrich, with Dave Shermann and Gary Isom		
Spicer, Ishmael	First "singing master" - music educators, often itinerant, specializing in choral music - in Baltimore, beginning in 1789 in a courthouse, students include John Cole		
Sprenkle, Elam	Teacher at the Peabody Institute, composer whose works have been widely performed		
Springer, Samuel	Preparatory faculty at the Peabody Institute, award-winning organist		
Steiff, Charles	19th century piano manufacturer, based in Baltimore		
Stellaccio, Cherie	Teacher at the Peabody Institute, long-time music educator, lecturer and vocalist		
Stepansky, Alan	Teacher at the Peabody Institute, award-winning cellist		
Stephenson, Mary Elizabeth	Preparatory faculty at the Peabody Institute, award-winning organist who has toured across the United States and abroad, and appeared on television and radio		
Stepp, Jasan	Guitarist for the Rockville, Maryland-based experimental bands Dog Fashion Disco and Polkadot Cadaver		
Sterling, Arnold	Baltimore-area jazz saxophonist		
Stevens, Jason	Guitarist for the Rockville, Maryland-based experimental band Dog Fashion Disco		
Stevenson, Bill	Member of Baltimore-based hardcore punk band Bollocks		
Stewart, Geoff	Saxophonist for the Rockville, Maryland-based experimental band Dog Fashion Disco		
Stewart, Reginald	Sixth music director of the Baltimore Symphony Orchestra, from 1917 to 1930, and director of the Peabody Institute		
Stoddard, William	Baltimore-based 19th century educator, co-founder of the Musical Institute, with John Hill Hewitt		
Stone, Richard	Teacher at the Peabody Institute, award-winning lutenist who has performed and recorded widely		
Stover, Chris	Bassist for Void, a punk band from Columbia, Maryland		
Strackbein, Michael	Bassist and vocalist for the Annapolis-area pop punk band The Track Record		
Strals, Nolen	Vocalist for the Baltimore-based rock band Double Dagger		
Strassburg, Mark	Guitarist and vocalist for the Rockville, Maryland-based speed metal band Indestroy		
Strube, Gustav	First music director of the Baltimore Symphony Orchestra, from 1917 to 1930, also a composer and teacher at the Peabody Institute		
Sult, Tim	Member of Germantown, Maryland-based stoner rock band Clutch		
Summerour, Jay	Folk performer, with Warner Williams		
Surber, John S.	Thirteenth bandmaster of the United States Naval Academy Band		
Sutherland, Donald	Teacher at the Peabody Institute, organist who has performed internationally		
Sutro, Otto	Former student at the Peabody Institute, later a publisher and music store owner		
Swanson, Tim	Keyboardist for the Rockville, Maryland-based experimental band Dog Fashion Disco		
Swindell, Bill	Baltimore-based jazz saxophonist from Washington, D.C.		
Tak, Young-ah	Preparatory faculty at the Peabody Institute, award-winning organist who has toured across the United States and abroad, and appeared on television and radio		
Talley, John Barry	Musician, Scholar, Educator, Director of Musical Activities at the United States Naval Academy 1971-2006		
Talley, Kevin	Former drummer for the Annapolis-based death metal band Dying Fetus and the Baltimore-based deathgrind band Misery Index		
Tanner, Evan	Former drummer for Potomac, Maryland-based doom metal band The Hidden Hand		
Tardue, Mark	Director of the Annapolis Chorale who organized a very successful concert that established the Chorale's reputation in 1977		
Taubenfield, Evan	Baltimore-born guitarist for Avril Lavigne		
Taylor, Angela (Revis)	Preparatory faculty at the Peabody Institute, computer musician and pop-rock singer-songwriter		
Temirkanov, Yuri	Eleventh music director of the Baltimore Symphony Orchestra, from 1999 to 2006		
Tennyson, J. D.	From Waldorf, Maryland, guitarist for pop-punk band Wakefield		
Theiss, Mike	Bassist for the Maryland-based doom metal band Revelation		
Theofanidis, Christopher	Teacher at the Peabody Institute, award-winning composer whose works have been widely performed		
Thomas, A. Jack	Bandleader for the Baltimore Colored City Band, Commonwealth Band, and one of the first African American bandmasters in the U.S. Army		
Thomas, Brandon	Musician originally from Baltimore		
Thomas, Edward	After giving him good advice on horse race-gambling, Thomas convinced Warner Studios boss Jack L. Warner to install air conditioning at the Tivoli Theatre in Frederick, Maryland, which attracted a legion of new audiences to what would eventually become the Weinberg Center for the Arts		
Thomas, Gary	Teacher at the Peabody Institute, acclaimed jazz flautist and saxophonist who has recorded on his own and with many successful performers		
Thomas, Paul	Originally from Waldorf, Maryland, bassist from pop-punk band Good Charlotte		
Thomas, Rich	Bassist for the Baltimore-based metal band Snydly Crunch		
Thrower, Thurman	Bass singer for the Baltimore-based African American doo wop group, with J&S Records, from the 1950s		
Timlin, Duane	Former drummer for the Annapolis-based death metal band Dying Fetus		
Tindley, Charles Albert	Influential gospel composer, originally from Berlin, Maryland		
Til, Sonny	Lead tenor of pioneering Baltimore-based doo wop group, The Orioles		
Tilghman, Charles Phillip	Baltimore-based entrepreneur and owner of one of the first minority-owned nightclubs in the country, The Sphinx Club, which opened in 1946		
Tinner, John	Banjoist for the John Ridgely Jazzers		
Tinto, Chris	Drummer for the Maryland-based hard metal band Deuce		
Torovsky, Adolph	Seventh bandmaster of the United States Naval Academy Band when it first recorded commercially in 1920		
Trnkova, Michaela	Preparatory faculty at the Peabody Institute, harpist who has toured widely		
Tseng, Keng-Yuen	Teacher at the Peabody Institute, award-winning violinist		
Tuckwell, Barry	First Music Director of the Maryland Symphony Orchestra in Hagerstown		
Turner, Irving	Member of the Baltimore-based African American doo wop group The Swallows, best known from their 1950s recordings		
Turner, Joe	Jazz pianist and master of the stride piano style born in Baltimore, Maryland, November 3, 1907 – July 21, 1990. Played with Benny Carter Orchestra and Louis Armstrong. Settled in Europe, living in Paris from 1962 until his death.		
Turner, Preston	Twelfth bandmaster of the United States Naval Academy Band		
Tyler, Veronica	Award-winning soprano and one of the first African American students at the Peabody Institute		
Valiente, Christian	Bassist and vocalist for the Annapolis-area rock band Jimmie's Chicken Shack		
Van Hulsteyn, Ruth	One of the first female violinists with the Baltimore Symphony Orchestra, during World War 2		
Van Sice, Robert	Teacher at the Peabody Institute, marimbist who has performed widely		
Van Steinberg, Kyle	Guitarist for the Maryland-based doom metal band Earthride		
Vance, Jonathan	Member of Annapolis-based band Moss Icon, singer for Moss Icon and Breathing Walker		
Venus, Mike	Drummer for the Baltimore-based band Hammers Rule		
Viti, Rob	Drummer for the Annapolis-area pop punk band The Track Record		
Voyles, Sparky	Guitarist for the Baltimore-based deathgrind band Misery Index, formerly of the Annapolis-based death metal band Dying Fetus		
Roger Wainwright	Member of the Baltimore-based African American vocal group The Buddies		
Walker, John	Teacher at the Peabody Institute, acclaimed concert organist and recording artist		
Wall, Susannah	Maryland-born colonial era singer and theater owner in Augusta, Georgia, and daughter of Thomas Wall, a theatrical manager in Baltimore		
Wall, Thomas	Owner of the first theatrical company in Baltimore in the 1780s		
Walschot-Stapp, Alstrid	Director of the Maryland Classic Youth Orchestras' harp ensemble, well-known concert harpist		
Waters, John	Baltimore-born filmmaker behind movies like the Baltimore-set musical Hairspray		
Watters, Sam	Songwriter and producer, formerly of Color Me Badd		
Watts, André	Graduate of the Peabody Institute and Grammy Award-winning classical pianist		
Weaver, Todd	Bassist for the Baltimore-based hard progressive metal band Apollo Ra		
Webb, Chick	Baltimore-born jazz drummer and bandleader		
Weiffenbach, John	Leader singer for Void, a punk band from Columbia, Maryland		
Weinberg, Alyce	With her husband Jan, donated the building to help the Tivoli Theatre in downtown Frederick recover from a flood, incarnated as the Weinberg Center for the Arts		
Weinberg, Dan	With his wife Alyce, donated the building to help the Tivoli Theatre in downtown Frederick recover from a flood, incarnated as the Weinberg Center for the Arts		
Weinrich, Scott	Leader of Potomac, Maryland-based doom metal band The Obsessed, and member of numerous other metal bands, including Spirit Caravan and The Hidden Hand		
Weisgall, Hugo	Teacher at the Peabody Institute, founder of the Baltimore Chamber Music Society		
Weiss, Piero	Teacher at the Peabody Institute, musicologist who has published a number of books and articles		
White, Brian	Bassist for the Rockville, Maryland-based experimental band Dog Fashion Disco		
White, Noel	Drummer for the Annapolis-based rock band the Jarflys		
Whiteman, Steve	Vocalist for the Hagerstown-based metal band Kix		
Wignell, Thomas	Composer, manager, with Alexander Reinagle of the Holliday Street Theater, one of the most important venues of colonial Baltimore		
Willen, Bruce	Bassist for the Baltimore-based rock band Double Dagger		
Williams, J. D.	Vocalist for Maryland-based doom metal band Internal Void		
Williams, Phillip	First singing master in Maryland, based at Annapolis' St. Anne's Anglican Church starting in 1764, but left after one year		
Williams, Shawn	Guitarist for the Rockville, Maryland-based speed metal band Indestroy		
Williams, Trey	Drummer for the Annapolis-based death metal band Dying Fetus		
Williams, Warner	Folk performer, with Jay Summerour		
Williams, Whit	Baltimore-area jazz saxophonist		
Willig, George	19th-century Baltimore music publisher		
Wilson, William Llewellyn	Conductor and cellist of the Baltimore Colored Chorus and Baltimore Colored Symphony Orchestra in the 1930s		
Wise, Wilmer	Trumpeter and first African American to join the Baltimore Symphony Orchestra, in 1965, and first African American faculty member at the Peabody Conservatory		
Wiser, Chris	Bassist for the Maryland-based death metal band Exmortis		
Wisner, Marc	Vocalist for the Baltimore-based metal band Rancid Decay		
Worden, John	Superintendent of the United States Naval Academy, who inaugurated several long-standing musical occasions at the Academy		
Young, Gene	Teacher at the Peabody Institute, composer and conductor of the Peabody Camerata		
Young, Bryan	Principal bassoon of the Baltimore Chamber Orchestra, founding member of the Poulenc Trio		
Younkins, Ronnie	Guitarist for the Hagerstown-based metal band Kix		
Zappa, Frank	Baltimore-born composer and musician		
Zee, Frank	Vocalist for the Maryland-based metal band Kingsbrook		
Zentek, Darren	Drummer for the Baltimore-based rock band, Channels, and formerly of Oswego and Kerosene 454		
Zentz, Bob	Popular folk musician who specializes in the Chesapeake Bay area		
Zepp, Jeff	Bassist for the Baltimore-based rock band 99 Burning		
Zimmerman, Charles Adam	Cornetist and organist, youngest bandmaster of the United States Naval Academy Band and composer of "Anchors Aweigh"		
Zinman, David	Tenth music director of the Baltimore Symphony Orchestra, from 1985 to 1998, also a violinist		
