= John Littlejohn (violinist) =

African-American violinist (born 1978)

John Littlejohn (born 1978), also known as John "Adidam" Littlejohn, is an African-American violinist, hip-hop artist, and music educator.

== Early life ==
Littlejohn was born in Lansing, Michigan, where he began playing the violin at the age of 10 in an orchestra class at a local middle school. Within the same year, his family moved to Midland, Michigan where he graduated from Midland High School. In Midland, John's family lived in a home built by Habitat for Humanity.

As a young musician, he toured Europe as a soloist and concertmaster of Blue Lake Fine Arts Camp's International Youth Symphony. He was also the youngest member of the Midland Symphony Orchestra. Ann Schoelles, was John's first musical mentor. He later earned degrees from the University of Michigan School of Music and the Peabody Institute, where he studied violin with Herbert Greenberg.

== Career ==
As the then concertmaster of the predominately African-American Soulful Symphony, Littlejohn was featured in The Baltimore Sun for his "boundary-free" approach to music, which embraces classical, hip-hop, jazz, and gospel music. He sometimes uses the moniker "Adidam," which is an acronym for "all day I dream about music."

In 2009, John was featured on NPR's All Things Considered for founding a summer music camp called "Thrive City String Academy" for low-income music students in Baltimore, Maryland.

John Littlejohn is currently the violinist of Infinitus, a beatboxing string trio based in Vancouver, Canada; and a pastor at Kingdom Life Community Church in Surrey, British Columbia.
