= Florestan (disambiguation) =

Florestan, Prince of Monaco was Prince of Monaco from 1841 to 1856.

Florestan may also refer to:

- Florestan, a character in Amadis of Gaul
- Florestan, a character in the opera Léonore, ou L'amour conjugal composed by Pierre Gaveaux
- Florestan, a character in the opera Fidelio composed by Ludwig van Beethoven
- "Florestan", a piece of Robert Schumann's Carnaval
- King Florestan XIV, a character in the ballet The Sleeping Beauty composed by Pyotr Ilyich Tchaikovsky

== See also ==
- Florestan Club
- Florestan Trio
