= United States Naval Academy Drum and Bugle Corps =

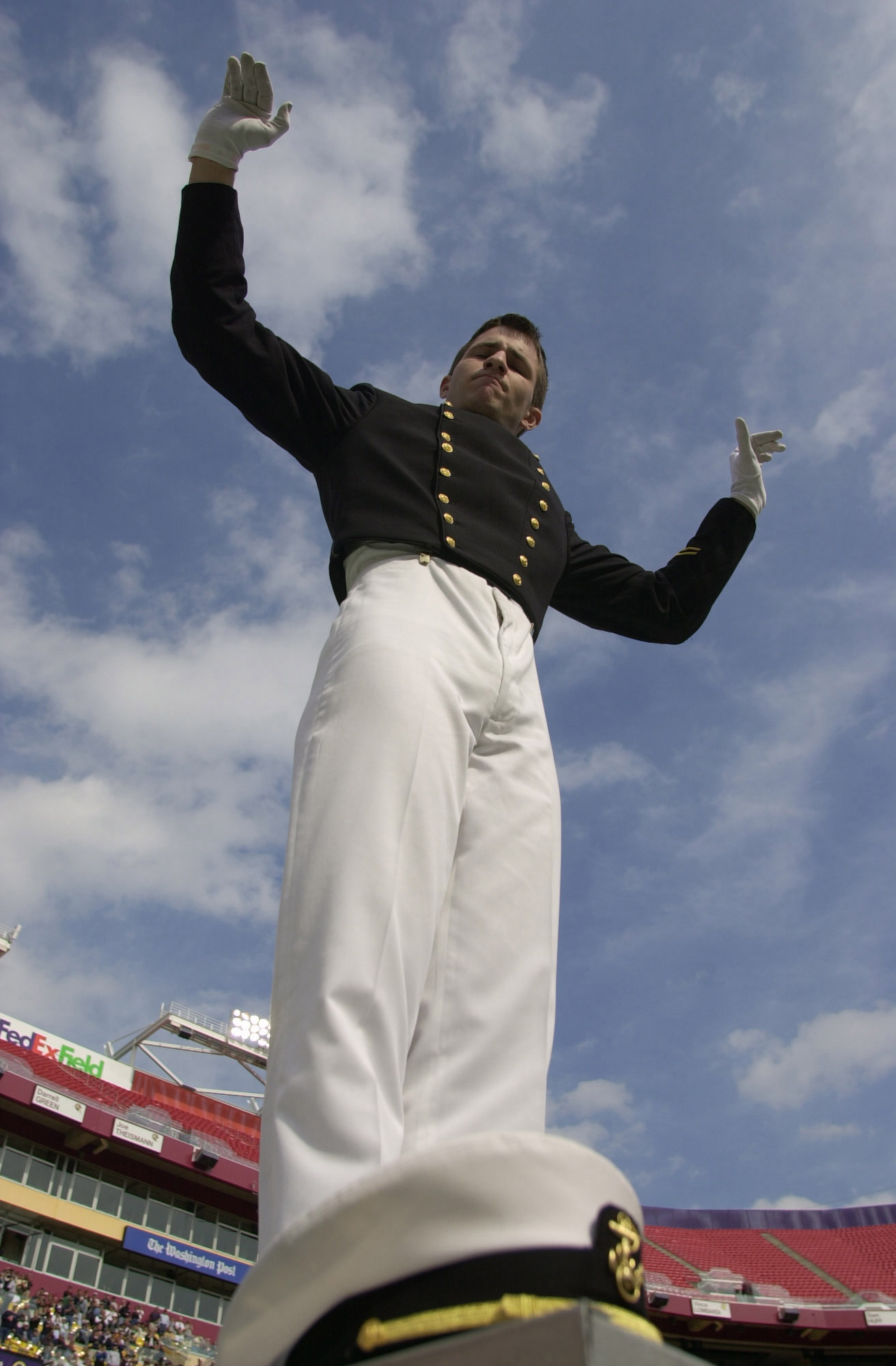
Midshipman John Weier leads the Drum and Bugle Corps during a halftime.

The United States Naval Academy Drum and Bugle Corps is the drum and bugle corps of the United States Naval Academy, which is a federal service academy in the United States Armed Forces based Maryland. Like its counterpart at the Air Force Academy, it is staffed by midshipmen from the Brigade of Midshipmen. It provides support to the brigade as well as the Plebe Summer Regiment. It currently performs over 70 times per year.

== Overview ==
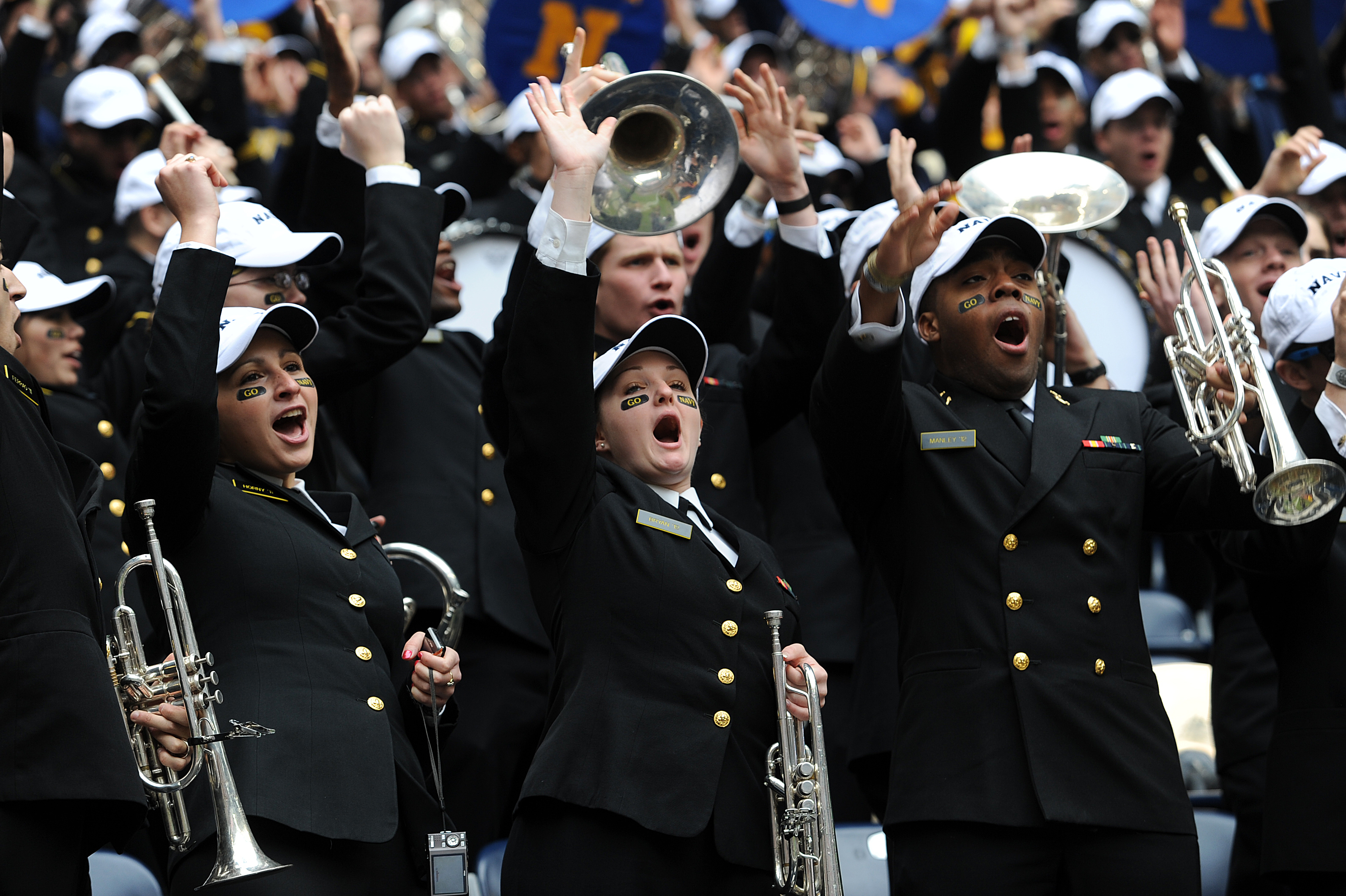
Members of the Drum and Bugle Corps during the 2009 Texas Bowl at Reliant Stadium.

It was founded in 1914 as the Midshipmen Drum and Bugle Corps. After a baseball game performance between St. John's College and the USNA, during which the 16-member band was led on the field by Midshipman R.W. Cary, the idea of a D&B Corps quickly came into fruition with a band forming and growing to the size of 59 over the next decade. By January 1922, it went defunct before being revived in 1926 at the request of Admiral Louis McCoy Nulton. The reason for its original disbandment was due to the deeming of it as a "luxury not a necessity" by Nulton's predecessor as superintendent of the U.S. Naval Academy. Throughout the 30s and 40s, it would get the nickname of "The Hell Cats" by affectionate supporters. Its numbers fluctuated over the years and by September 1945, was reorganized to include 25 new tenor bugles, 5 baritones and 18 field drums among others. It was officially incorporated into the Brigade of Midshipmen on 16 March 1946 through an order that stated that the corps were to "participate in Brigade functions".

Today, it performs many of the functions that are designated for a typical college marching band, including providing pep bands for USNA's sports teams as well as performing drill routines for events like the Army–Navy Game. Most of these college-like events take place at the Navy–Marine Corps Memorial Stadium in Annapolis. It also serves as a military band for functions in which it provides martial music. It also is present during noon meal formation as well as dress parades. It is additionally a public relations asset for the USNA. It also participates in drum and bugle competitions, particularly inter-service competitions sponsored and organized by Drum Corps International. It has performed for presidents such as John F. Kennedy, Richard Nixon, and Ronald Reagan. In 2014, the Corps celebrated its centennial anniversary.

== Staff ==
The drum and bugle corps has the following personnel staff:

- Robert Stojakovich; Corps Director
- Chris McMahan – Front Ensemble Instructor
- Todd Clontz – Brass Instructor
- Aaron Peach – Brass Instructor
- Kim Mogensen – Brass Instructor
- Staff Sergeant Selena Maytum – Brass Instructor
- Chris Previc – Visual Instructor
- Matthew Manturuk – Front Ensemble Consultant
- Kevin Meyer – Front Ensemble Consultant
- Senior Chief Dan Schaffer – Senior Enlisted Advisor
- Commander Logan Schulze – Officer Representative

== See also ==
- United States Naval Academy Band
- United States Naval Academy Pipes and Drums
