= Roomrunner =

American noise rock band

- Roomrunner performing live in 2012, as seen in a video still.

Background information
- Origin: Baltimore, Maryland, USA
- Genres: Noise rock, alternative rock, indie rock
- Years active: 2010–2015
- Label: Fan Death Records
- Members: Denny Bowen; Jeff Byers; Dan Frome; Bret Lanahan
- Past members: Sam Garrett; John Jones; Christopher Morwaski
- Website: roomrunner.org

Roomrunner was a noise rock group from Baltimore, Maryland, fronted by Denny Bowen, formerly of Double Dagger, Yukon, and The Dan Deacon Ensemble. The group also included prominent Baltimore recording engineer Dan Frome on bass. Past members have included Bowen's one-time Yukon bandmate Sam Garrett, and John Jones, who went on to join Dope Body. To date, they have released a cassette tape and an EP on Fan Death Records and have toured North America, playing with the likes of Dan Deacon, Future of the Left, and METZ.

The name Roomrunner comes from the wasei Japanese word used for "treadmill." The band's sound has been described as "a conscious effort to revive the fuzz and feedback-laden churn of early-1990s indie rock. . . [but] theirs is a more ebullient take on the genre."

In August 2015, the band announced on their Facebook page that they will be playing their last show in Baltimore in October 2015. The band headlined the final night of U+N Fest 4 at The Ottobar on October 3, 2015.

== Discography ==
=== Albums ===
- Ideal Cities LP, Fan Death Records, 2013

=== Singles and EPs ===
- Separate 12" EP, Accidental Guest Recordings, 2014
- S/T Cassette, Fan Death Records, 2011
- Super Vague 12" EP, Fan Death Records, 2012
