= Dope Body =

American rock band

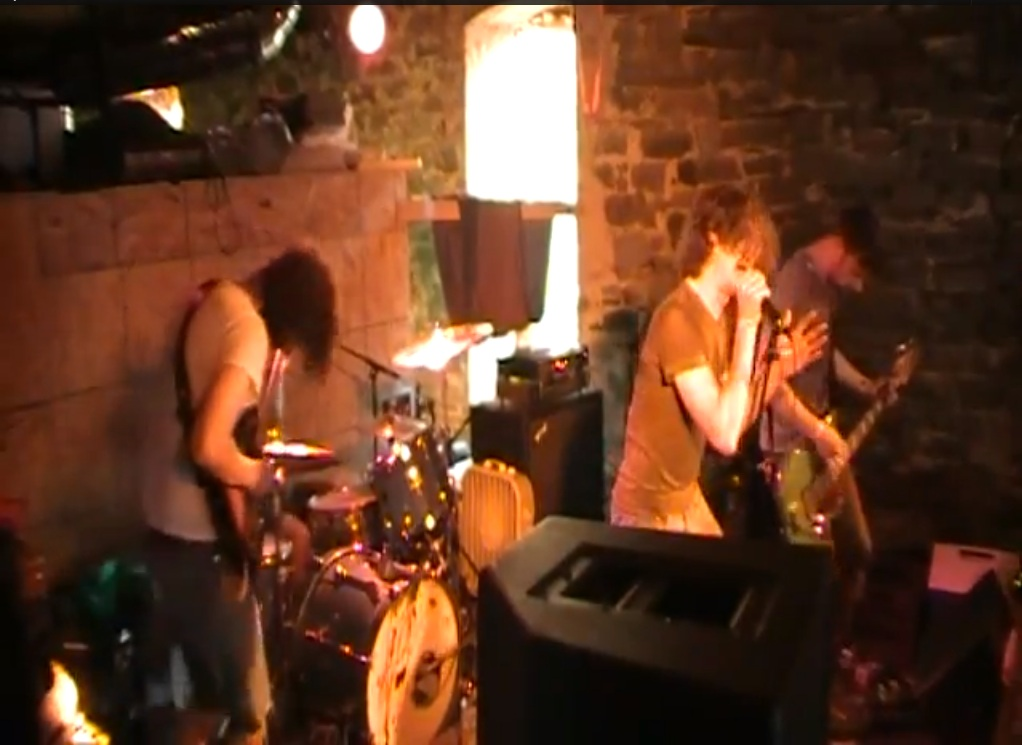
- Dope Body performing in 2011, as seen in a video still.

Background information
- Origin: Baltimore, Maryland, U.S.
- Genres: Noise rock; post-hardcore; alternative rock; sludge metal; hardcore punk
- Years active: 2008–2016, 2020–2021
- Labels: Drag City, Hoss, Black Tent Press, Forge Again, Watercolor
- Members: David Jacober; John Jones; Andrew Laumann; Zachary Utz
- Past members: Jesse Lyell

Dope Body is an American rock band from Baltimore, Maryland, United States. They formed in 2008 by vocalist Andrew Laumann, guitarist/bassist Zachary Utz, and drummer David Jacober. They released four albums in addition to a cassette tape and two split records. They expanded to a quartet, adding bassist Jesse Lyell in 2011, who was replaced by John Jones, late of local contemporaries Roomrunner, the next year.

== History ==
All natives of the Baltimore area, Dope Body, named for a quote from an online video the band enjoyed, originally came together in 2008 for a one-off show at Baltimore's Natural History museum space, while Andrew Laumann was located in San Francisco. The show was very successful, and the band continued, with Laumann soon moving back to Baltimore and the group releasing the Twenty Pound Brick cassette the next year. More live dates with the likes of Double Dagger soon followed, as well as a split LP with Brooklyn duo Orphan. 2011 was an especially productive year for Dope Body, with their debut full length Nupping coming out on Hoss Records, followed by a split record with Detroit's Child Bite. The group expanded its lineup in 2011, adding Jesse Lyell, who had played with Baltimore punk band Sick Weapons, as a full-time bassist. 2012 saw Lyell leaving the group with John Jones, formerly of Roomrunner taking his place, and the release of Natural History on Drag City records, which was recorded with J. Robbins of Jawbox fame. Dope Body also toured Europe in 2012, released their Saturday EP in 2013 and released their album LIFER in 2014.

Dope Body decided to call it quits in 2016. They played two final shows in May; one at Metro Gallery and one at Floristree. All members are planning to stay active in the Baltimore arts and music scene; Utz and Jacober play with Lexie Mountain in the band Scroll Downers, John makes music as Nerftoss, and Andrew is keeping busy with the Baltimore visual arts scene as a director of Maurice, a new, experimental gallery in Baltimore.

Dope Body reformed in 2020; releasing their album Home Body in May, and Crack A Light in October. The band entered an “indefinite hiatus” the following year.

== Sound and style ==
Dope Body has been described as "a speedball of dirty noise rock and radio friendly alt. rock" and compared to Rage Against the Machine and Brainiac.

The bands sound and style has been largely described as noise rock, post-hardcore, garage rock, garage punk, sludge metal, hardcore punk and even alternative, however the band have also experimented with genres like funk metal, grunge, hard rock, noise, psychedelic rock, experimental rock, post-punk and even with more recent projects electronic music and drone. The band have also mentioned in interviews that they are influenced by hip hop and dance music in terms of groves and rhythm.

== Discography ==
=== Albums ===
- Nupping, Hoss, 2011
- Natural History, Drag City, 2012
- Lifer, Drag City, 2014
- Kunk, Drag City, 2015
- Home Body, Drag City, 2020
- Crack A Light, Drag City, 2020

=== Split Albums and EPs ===
- Self Entitled (split with Orphan), Black Tent Press, 2010
- Split with Child Bite, Forge Again, 2011

=== Mixtapes and Cassettes ===
- Twenty Pound Brick, Watercolor, 2009
- Home Body, Drag City, 2020

=== Singles and EPs ===
- Saturday, Drag City, 2013
