= Yukon (band) =

American experimental band

Yukon was an American three-piece experimental band from Baltimore, Maryland.

The band consisted of Nick Podgurski (drums/vocals), Sam Garrett (guitar) and Brad Smith (bass). Various four-piece incarnations included Denny Bowen (of Double Dagger and Roomrunner), and Tom Ferrara.

Regional and national touring with Little Women, Calabi Yau, Archaeopteryx and Rick Weaver of The New Flesh. Yukon also performed at Whartscape and the International Noise Conference (Miami, FL) in 2007. Members of Yukon co-curated with fellow Brooklyn math-rock band, Stay Fucked, the Dark Forces Swing Blind Punches festival in Philadelphia, which was held December 2006 and featured current innovative music from bands such as Dysrhythmia and Zs.

In 2007 the album Mortar was co-released by the band in part with Terra Firma Records. It was followed in 2008 by the EP Medallion on Infinite Limbs. In the time that passed between Mortar and Medallion the band saw the exchange of original guitarist Tom Ferrara for Sam Garrett and the exit of guitarist/vocalist Denny Bowen. Medallion is the only recorded output of the shortly lived four-piece including both Garrett and Bowen on guitar. Medallion was recorded with Bowen on guitar after his leaving the band. This began the band's shift into trio and Podgurski's role as both drummer and vocalist. In early 2009, the song "Zero Gravity Chamber" was re-released as part of Damage Rituals Cassettes' "The Dead Hand: Human Machines" compilation along with tracks from groups such as Zs, Weasel Walter Trio, and Muscle Brain.

The final self-titled record is available on cassette via Damage Rituals Cassettes. This is last record and only full-length featuring the trio lineup.

N. Podgurski now runs New Firmament and performs as both New Firmament and Feast of the Epiphany. Sam Garrett is currently an active composer of both chamber works and music under the name Voice Coils. Brad Smith is playing bass in Slow Bull.

== Members ==
- Sam Garrett – (guitar)
- Nick Podgurski – (drums/vocals)
- Brad Smith – (bass)

Former Members:

- Denny Bowen (guitar/vocals, until November 2007)
- Tom Ferrara (guitar, until June 2006)

== Discography ==
- Gough (Starter Home) 7" (2005) - Human Conduct Records [HC-033]
- Gerard (2006) - Self-Released Tour CD
- Mortar (2006) - Terra Firma Records [TFR-003]
- Medallion EP (2008)
- The Dead Hand: Human Machines Compilation (2009) - Damage Rituals Cassettes [DR001]
- Yukon (2011) - Damage Rituals Cassettes [DR004]
