= Tuesday Club =

Association football club gatherings

The Tuesday Club was the name of social gatherings held by players of English association football club Arsenal in the 1990s. It was viewed as a club bonding experience by the players and manager, George Graham.

== History ==
The Tuesday Club involved regular heavy drinking sessions by Arsenal players in the 1990s. These sessions were led by Arsenal captain Tony Adams and usually involved other Arsenal players such as Lee Dixon, Perry Groves and Paul Merson. It became known as the Tuesday Club as the events occurred on Tuesday nights as Arsenal had a day off from training on Wednesdays. Merson wrote that Graham was aware of the sessions but ignored them as the participants always arrived for training on Thursdays. Regular participants of The Tuesday Club also indulged in eating contests during trips to away games.

== Antics ==
The Tuesday Club also became known for the antics of some of the participants. In 1990, Merson, Nigel Winterburn and two other Arsenal players were sent home from an Arsenal tour to Singapore due to being involved in a drinking session. In 1995, Ray Parlour was arrested for assault for throwing prawn crackers at a taxi before hitting the driver during an Arsenal tour to Hong Kong. This led to Parlour being fined HK$2,000 by Eastern Magistrates Court and £5,000 by Arsenal. In 1996, Adams and Parlour deliberately set off a fire extinguisher in a restaurant.

The Tuesday Club was unofficially ended by the appointment of Arsène Wenger as Arsenal manager as he portrayed alcohol negatively in order to change the culture at Arsenal. This initially included bans on alcohol in the players' lounge at Highbury and then a complete club ban on alcohol for players in 2004.

== Podcast ==
In 2010 the It's Up For Grabs Now podcast was renamed after the Tuesday Club. It is hosted by comedian Alan Davies alongside Keith Dover, Tayo Popoola, Ian Stone and Damian Harris. The podcast received notoriety in newspapers after Davies criticised Liverpool for refusing to play on the date of the anniversary of the Hillsborough disaster.
