= Timothy Swanson =

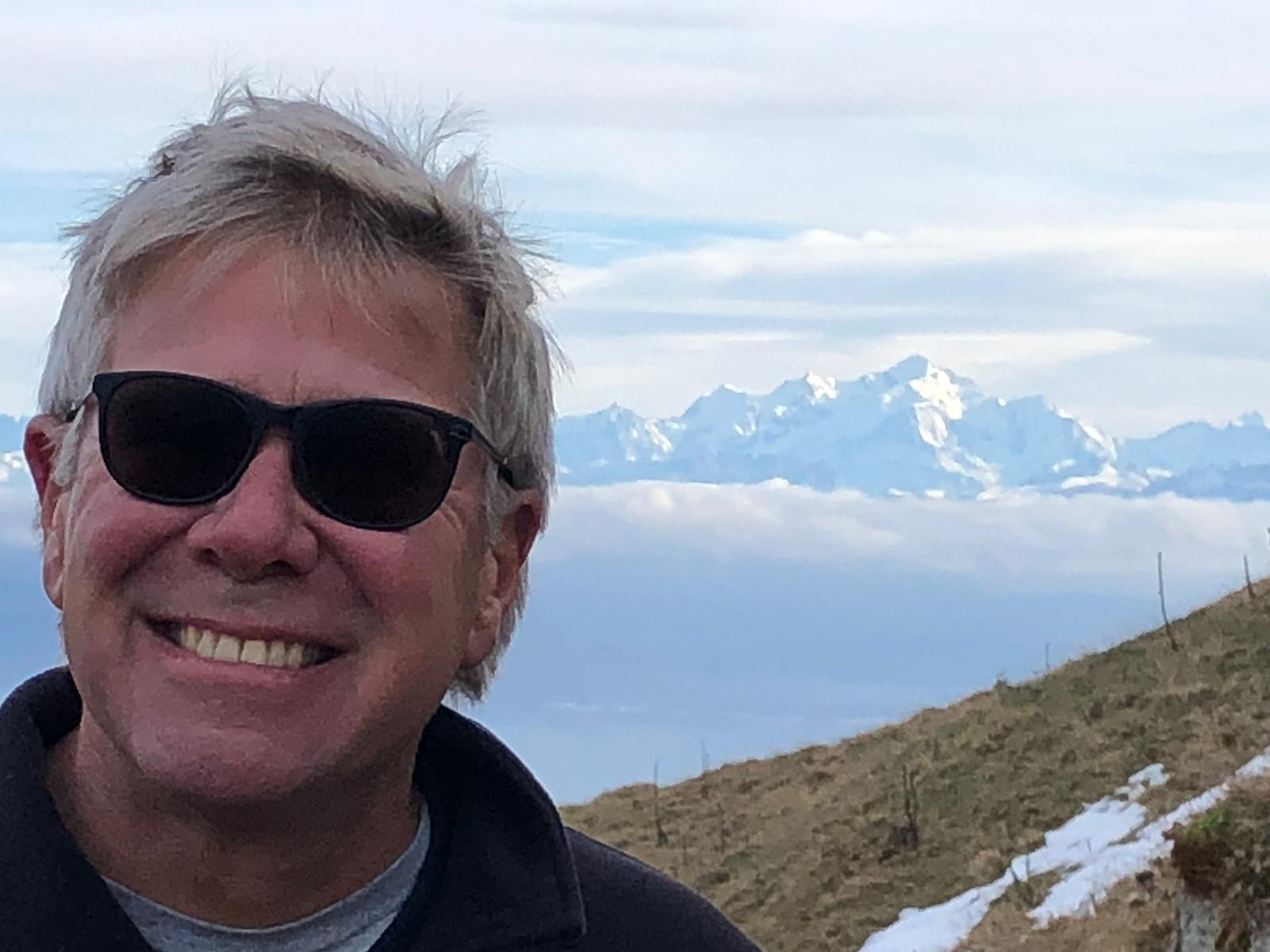
Tim Swanson walking in the Alps

Timothy Swanson is an American economics scholar specializing in environmental governance, biodiversity, water management, as well as intellectual property rights and biotechnology regulation.

He is a professor in resource economics at the Graduate Institute of International and Development Studies in Geneva, currently the holder of the Andre Hoffmann Chair in Environmental Economics.

== Background ==
After receiving graduate degrees in economics and law at the University of Michigan, Swanson completed his PhD at the London School of Economics under the supervision of Lord Nicholas Stern. Swanson currently holds the André Hoffmann Chair of Environmental Economics at the Graduate Institute of International and Development Studies in Geneva, where he is also director of the Centre for International Environmental Studies. In parallel, Swanson is also affiliated professor at the University of Cambridge. Previously he held the Chair in Law & Economics at University College London and was research Director for the United Kingdom's National Centre on Social and Economic Research on the Global Environment. Prior to that, he began his academic career as a Lecturer in the Faculty of Economics at Cambridge University, 1991-1998. He was also a visiting professor at the University of Washington from 2004 to 2005.

== Work ==
His research covers the issues dealing with legal reform and institution building in the areas of environment, intellectual property and technology. He has advised the governments of China, India, and many international and development agencies.

His work on biotechnology and IPR has looked especially at how the gains from global agricultural innovation are distributed. His work on China has presented the role of regulation in environmental and industrial policy, and looked at various case studies of its impact. His work on water management has considered how water can be allocated between various activities in an equitable and efficient manner, and also how regulation of water can manage quality.

Another body of work looks at international environmental problems, and the use of international law and institutions in their management. In particular, Swanson has done much work in the area of global biodiversity and its management. And, Swanson has focused on the conservation of wildlife and how important government management is in conservation concerns.

In regard to international conservation, Swanson has argued that important issues in wildlife management are not a result of the tragedy of the commons as often thought, but that it lies in the failure of governments "to control access to wildlife and the land it occupies..., [in the] 'opportunity costs, alternative development priorities, governance problems and resources'." In this analysis, the ivory trade is a consequence of government decisions to not invest in the maintenance of elephant populations, not an unintended outcome.
