= The Marylanders =

The Marylanders were a mid-20th century doo wop group, based in Baltimore, Maryland. The membership included Johnny Page, a singer and member of an urban street gang called The Dungaree Boys.

Van McCoy sang with The Marylanders for a time. The Marylanders have several well-known songs, including "Please Love Me" and "Make Me Thrill Again".
