= Channels (band) =

American rock band

Channels is a rock band based in Baltimore, Maryland, formed in 2003.

The band features Jawbox and Burning Airlines frontman J. Robbins, as well as bassist Janet Morgan and drummer Darren Zentek of Kerosene 454 and Oswego.

Channels features Morgan on co-lead and backing vocals—giving the band a melodic approach to the vocals. Channels features Robbins' most lyrically political writing.

Robbins and Zentek also currently perform with Vic Bondi as Report Suspicious Activity. Both musicians released an EP as Office of Future Plans (along with Brooks Harlan and Gordon Withers) and have released material on DeSoto Records and Dischord Records.

== Discography ==
- Open EP (2004)
- Waiting For the Next End of the World (2006)
- Backpfeifengesicht EP (2017)
