= United States Naval Academy Band =

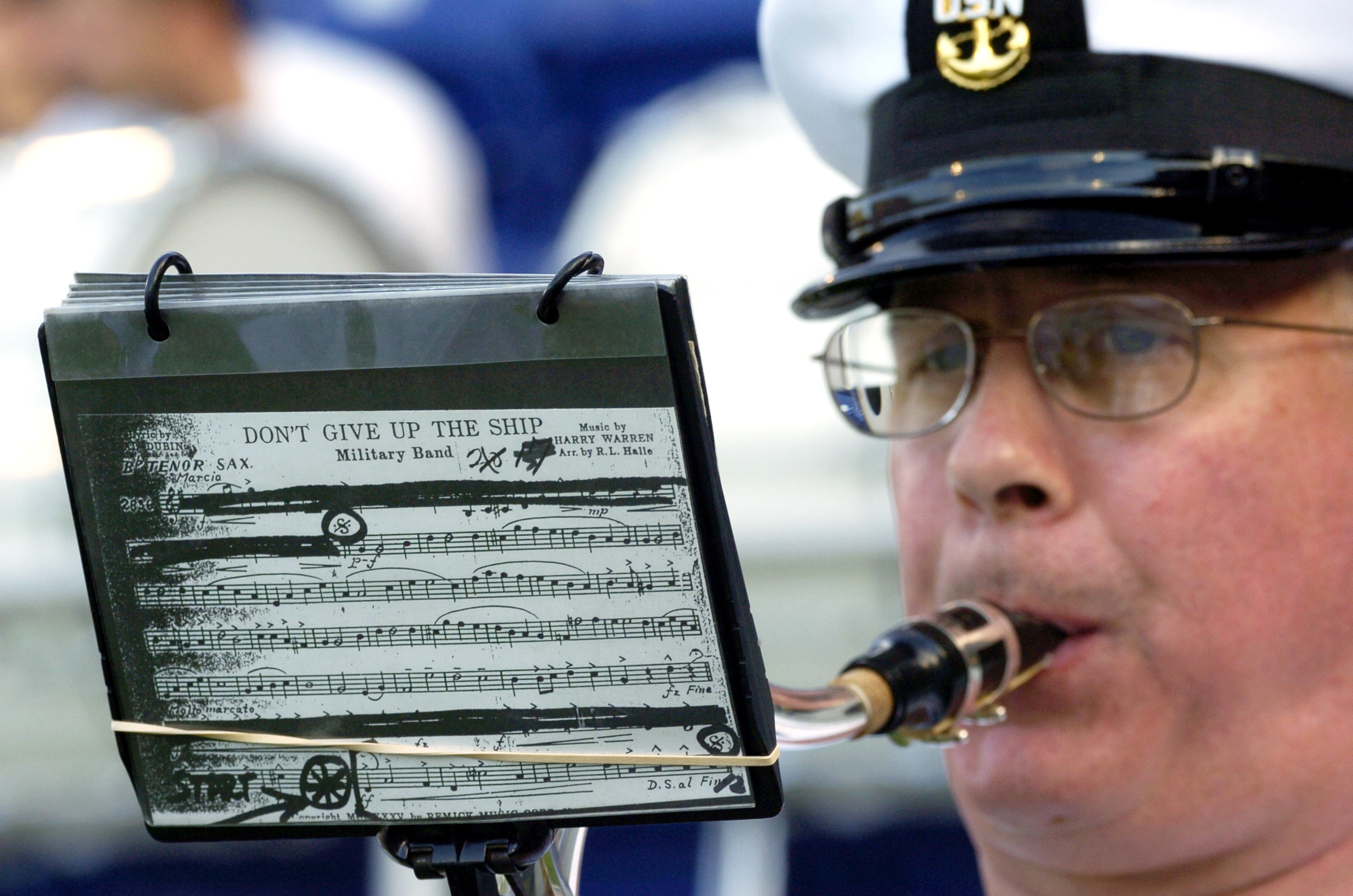
- A United States Naval Academy Band musician plays a service song prior to the kick-off of a season home-opener football game, which pitted the Navy Midshipmen against Duke Blue Devils.
- Founded: November 1852; 173 years ago
- Country: United States
- Branch: United States Navy
- Garrison/HQ: United States Naval Academy
- Nicknames: "The Navy's Oldest and Finest"
- Website: www.usna.edu/USNABand/index.php

Commanders
- Director: Commander Diane Nichols
- Senior Enlisted Leader: Master Chief Petty Officer Todd Nix

The United States Naval Academy Band was officially founded in November 1852. Previously, there had been a band since the founding of the Naval Academy in 1845, consisting of a fifer and a drummer. The band consists of US Navy career musicians. The band is required to blend tradition and change into a wide variety of musical styles.

The Naval Academy Band is one of two Navy premier bands. The Washington DC Navy Band and the Academy Band is staffed based on auditions not limited to military personnel. Winners of the auditions are required to attend boot camp. Upon completion they are awarded the rank of E-6, Petty Officer First Class. They have been granted an exemption to wear the same uniform as a Chief Petty Officer to maintain a consistent appearance. The crest on their hats are a musician's lyre. Their career can be entirely at this one duty station. The Directors are the only officers and the only members who are subject to transfers.

The band has been termed "the Chief's Band" by midshipmen to distinguish it from the Naval Academy Drum and Bugle Corps, which is staffed by midshipmen.

== Performances ==
The United States Naval Academy Band leads a column of Midshipmen on military parade before dignitaries on Worden Field, advances into Navy/Marine Corps Stadium for a contest in American football, escorts a fallen shipmate to his final resting place, or represents the Navy and Naval Academy on “Main Street, USA” in their Memorial Day celebration.

The Concert Band performs a year-round concert series. Performances include programs of light classics, popular melodies, patriotic songs, and marches. It performs at special events including the Side-By-Side concert with local high school musicians chosen to play with the band under the baton of a special guest conductor, and the annual Finale Concert featuring all Naval Academy Band ensembles and closing with Tchaikovsky’s “1812 Overture”, complete with live cannon fire. Smaller ensembles are featured in the Chamber Music Series, a variety of recitals planned and presented by individual band members. The Electric Brigade, the Navy’s premier Top 40 Band, aids recruiting by acquainting young Americans with the Navy and the United States Armed Forces, in addition to performances for the Brigade of Midshipmen in functions ranging from formal occasions such as the Graduation Ball during Commissioning Week to informal dances, pep rallies, and company picnics. From its 66 members, the band has two jazz groups, brass and woodwind quintets, trombone and clarinet quartets, tuba and percussion ensembles, and two reception combos.

A succession of 26 leaders and hundreds of instrumentalists have been members of the band.

== See also ==
- United States Navy Band
- U.S. Armed Forces School of Music
- U.S. Navy Steel Band (defunct)
- United States Naval Academy Pipes and Drums
- United States military bands
- "Anchors Aweigh"
- "Eternal Father, Strong to Save"
- United States Naval Academy Drum and Bugle Corps
