= William Llewellyn Wilson =

American conductor (1887–1950)

William Llewellyn Wilson (1887–1950) was a Baltimore-born African American conductor, musician, music educator, and music critic. He was influential in the founding of the Baltimore City Colored Orchestra in 1930 and was its principle cellist. He became its conductor in 1933. Wilson was also a music critic for the Afro-American, a major African American periodical in Baltimore in the early 20th century.

Wilson taught at Frederic Douglass High School in Baltimore, Maryland during the 1920s and 1930s, nurturing the early talents of many who later rose to prominence, including Eubie Blake, Paul Brent, Anne Brown, Blanche Calloway, Cab Calloway, Mark Fax, Bill Kenny, Thomas Henderson Kerr Jr., and Ellis Larkins.
