= Weinberg Center =

Arts center, theater and movie theater in Frederick, Maryland, United States

Weinberg Center for the Arts
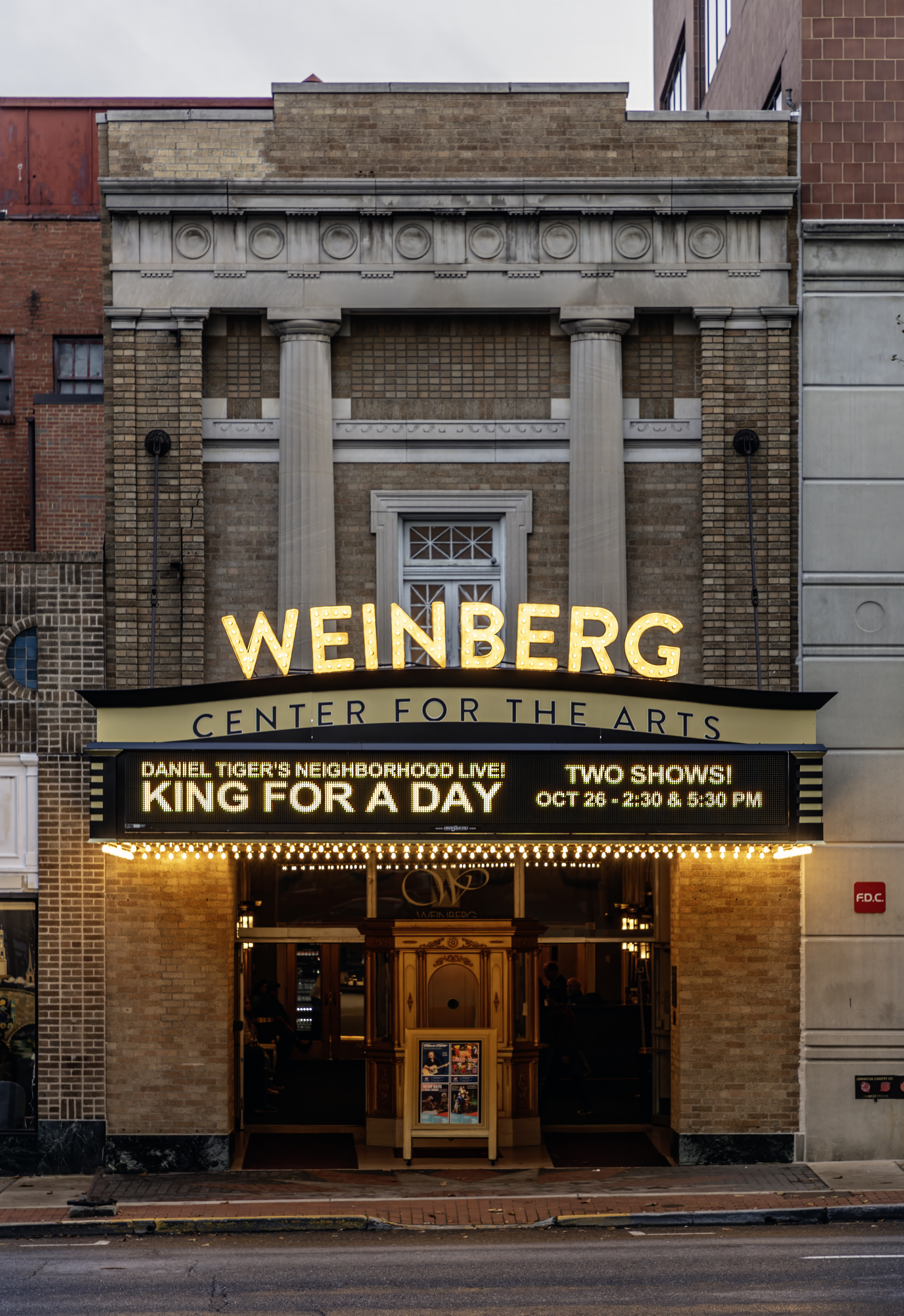
- Weinberg Center in 2023
- Interactive map of Weinberg Center for the Arts
- Address: 20 West Patrick Street
- Location: Frederick, MD 21701
- Coordinates: 39.414016°N 77.411658°W
- Seating type: Reserved seating

Website
- weinbergcenter.org

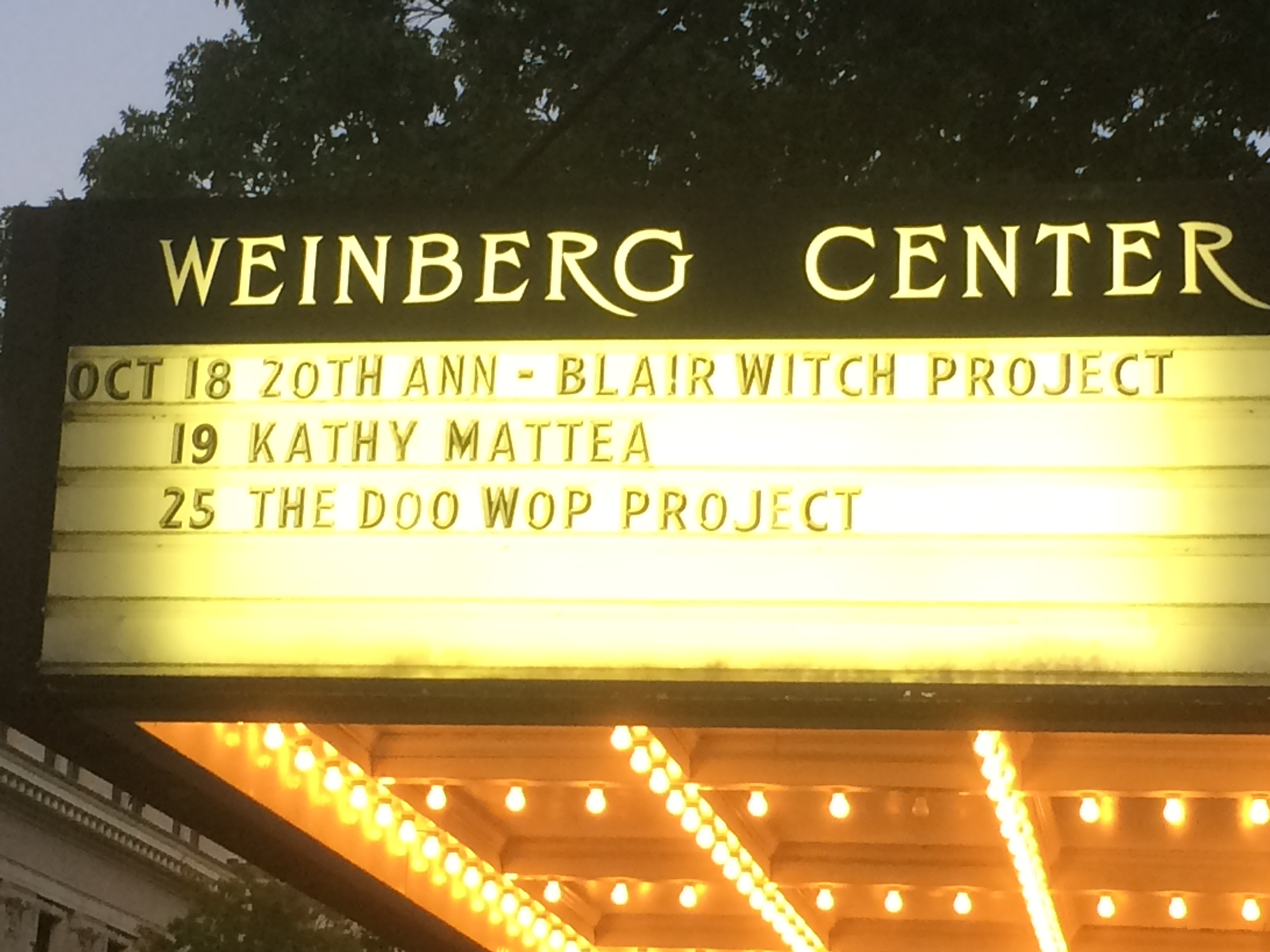
The Blair Witch Project 20th Anniversary Edition Screening

The Weinberg Center is a 1,143-seat theater building located in Frederick, Maryland. It holds various showings of music, theater, films, studio screenings, conventions, weddings, business meetings, television and commercial location shoots and visual arts.

== History ==
The theatre was built as the Tivoli Theatre by the Stanley-Crandall Company and opened on December 23, 1926. It was the premiere movie theatre of Frederick for nearly fifty years but closed after considerable damage suffered in a 1976 flood. The Weinberg family, which then owned the old movie palace, chose to present it to the city as a gift rather than attempt to keep it open as a movie house. The theatre has been maintained in the splendid style of 1926. The theatre's organ, a two-manual, eight-rank Wurlitzer, is the only original theatre organ installation in the state. The Weinberg Center holds several dozen events every year, and has an annual budget of one million dollars.
