= United States Naval Academy Pipes and Drums =

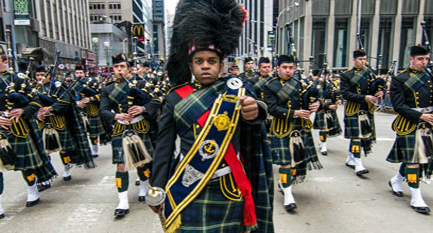
The USNA Pipes and Drums

The United States Naval Academy Pipes and Drums is a highland musical midshipman unit of the United States Naval Academy (USNA). Currently, the 42-member military pipe band is the only active duty unit of its kind in any service of the Department of the Navy (United States Marine Corps included). The band group provides musical support to the academy's Brigade of Midshipmen as well as the larger city of Annapolis, Maryland. It is one of several service academies and senior military colleges to maintain bagpipe bands, alongside the West Point Pipes and Drums, the Pipes and Drums of The Citadel and the Virginia Military Institute Pipes and Drums. The USNA Pipe Band is one of the more recent of these types of bands, being established in 1996 with funding being provided by members of the Annapolis class of 1961. It was officially approved as a Brigade Support Activity (BSA) three years later.

Today, it provides musical support for the following events and musical requirements of the USNA:

- Graduation and commissioning ceremonies of USNA Classes
- Military/patriotic ceremonies
- Public concerts and social events
- Retirement ceremonies
- Funerals
- Sporting events/televised performances
- Organized civil/military parades
- Celtic, Scottish and other cultural festivals
- Pipe band competitions
- Any other solo activity or joint activity with the United States Naval Academy Band

The band wears a kilt which features the Polaris Military Tartan when they are in the parade ground. The design originated in the early 1960s and was pioneered by Captain Walter Schlech and Alexander MacIntyre of Strone. The tartan is patterned in service tartan of the navy and is similar to the Black Watch tartan with the only difference being the addition of a four thread overcheck consisting of yellow–black–sky blue–black–yellow.

== Gallery ==
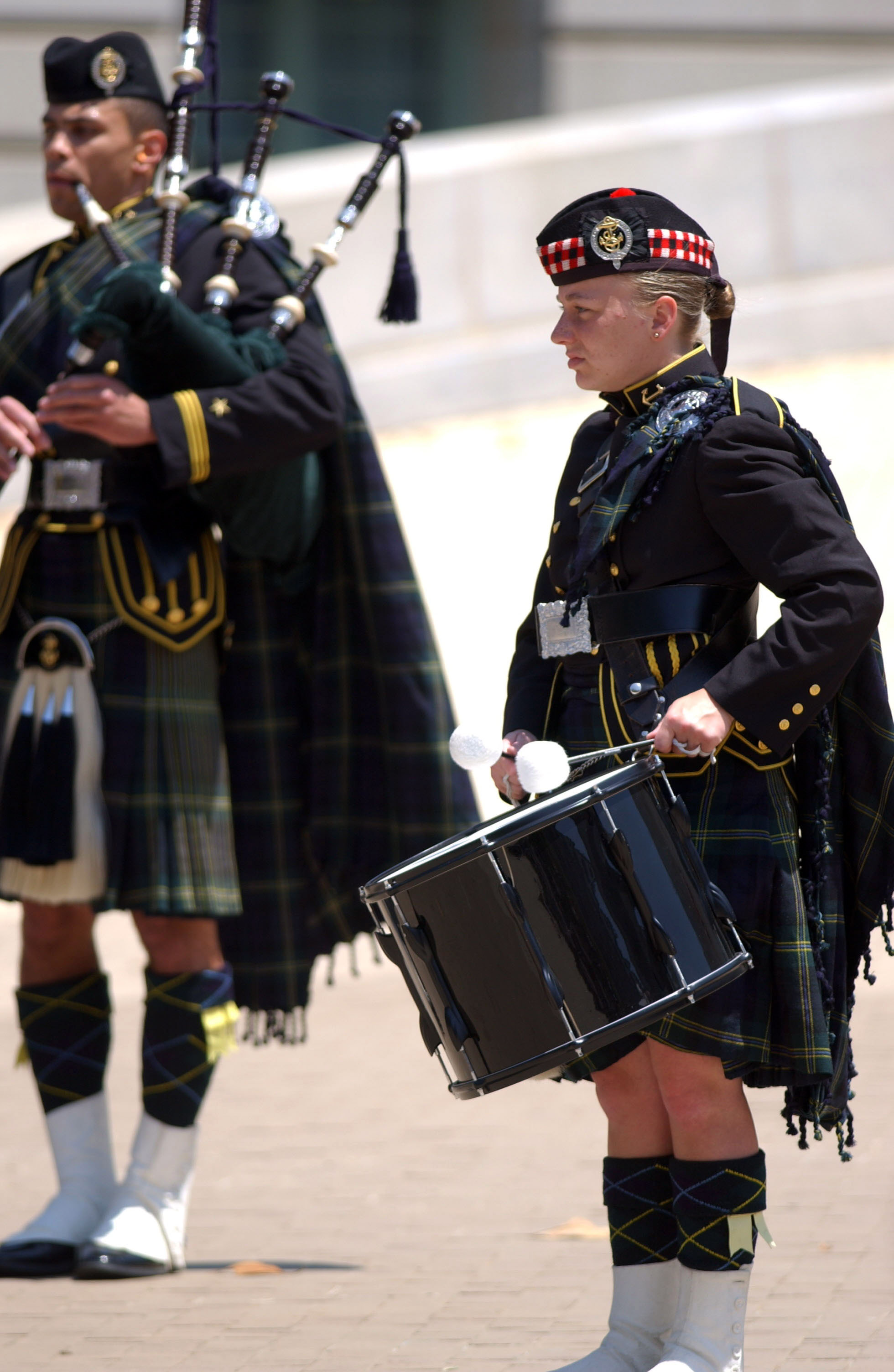

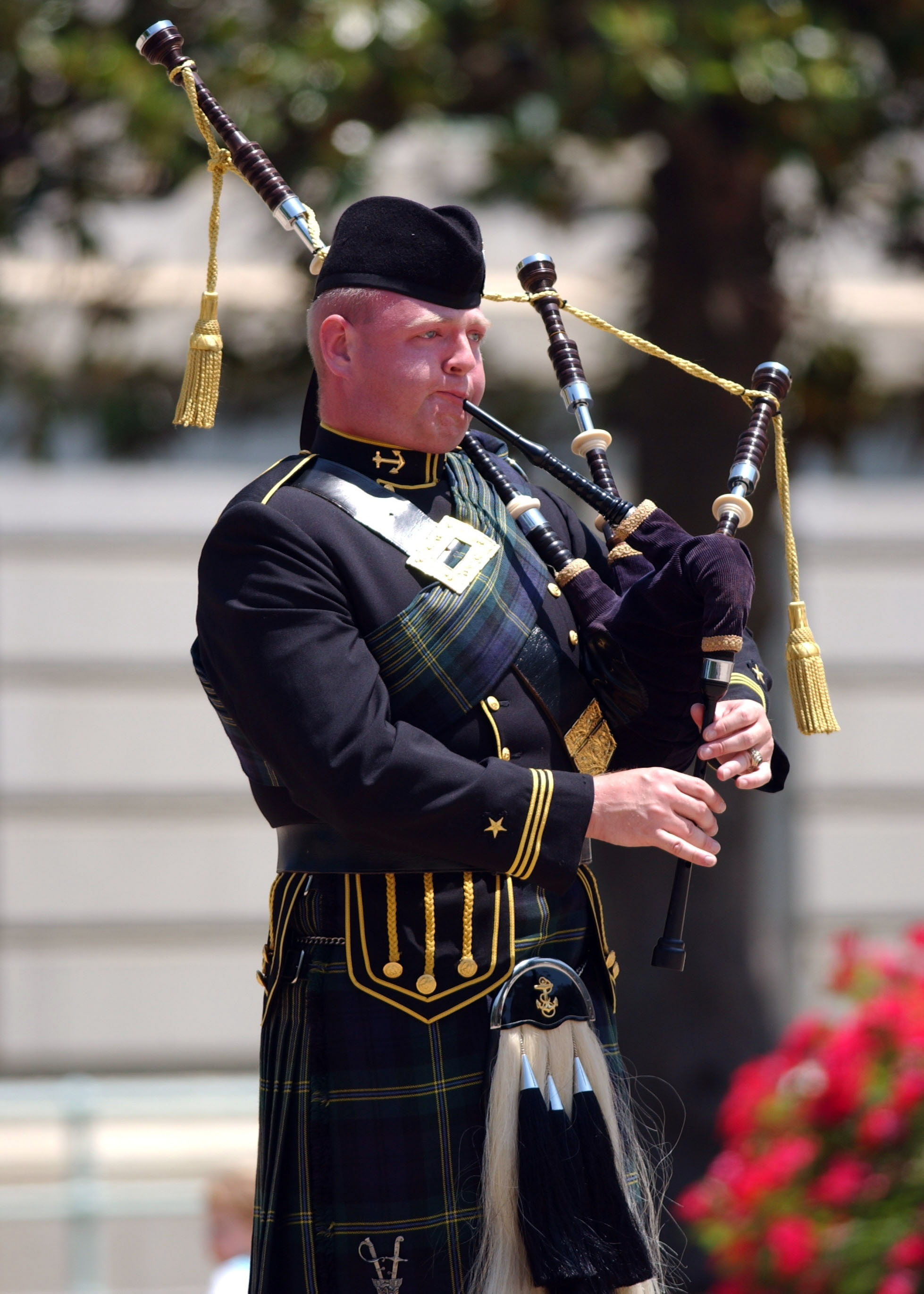

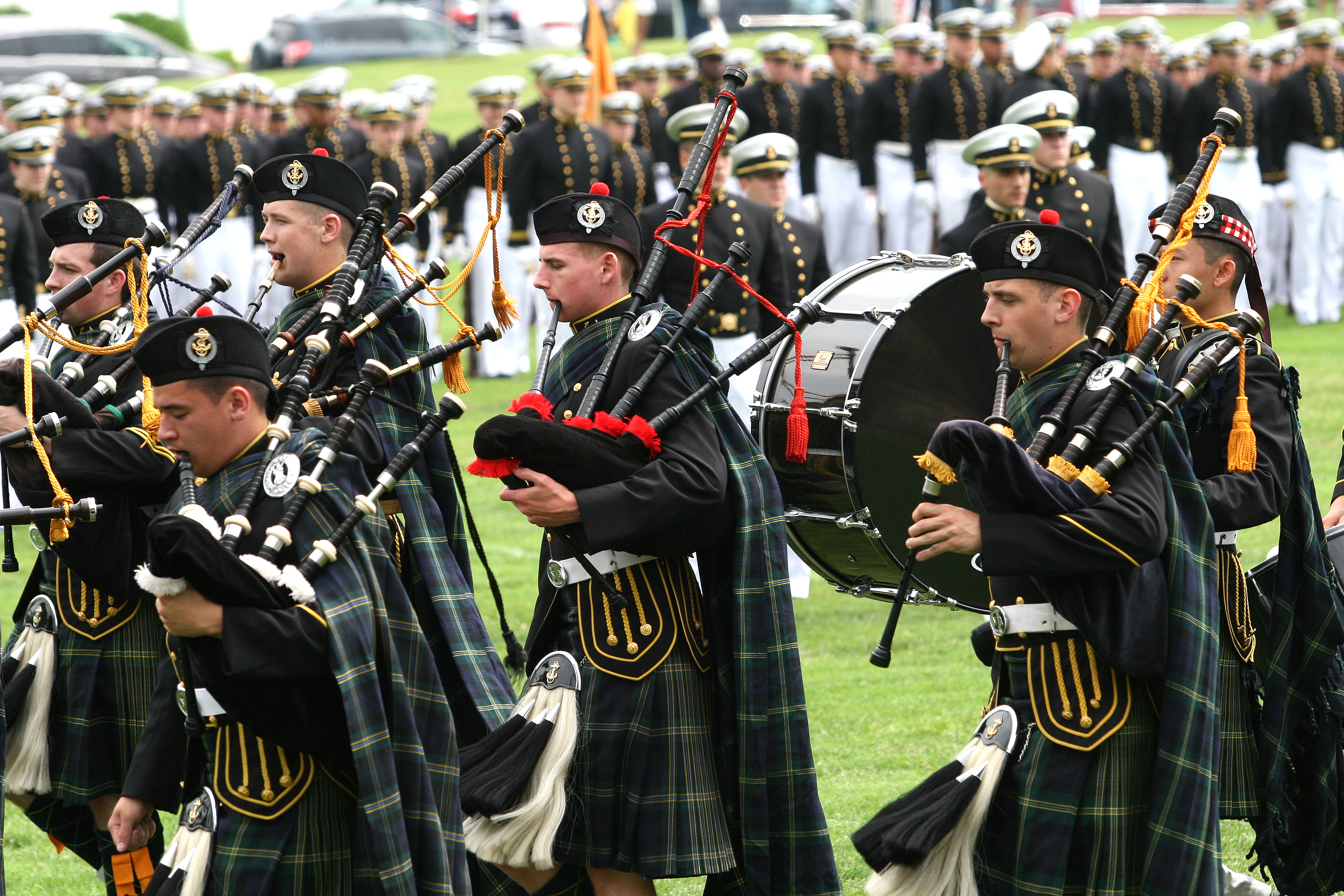

The Polaris Military Tartan
