= Little Bit a Blues =

American folk music duo

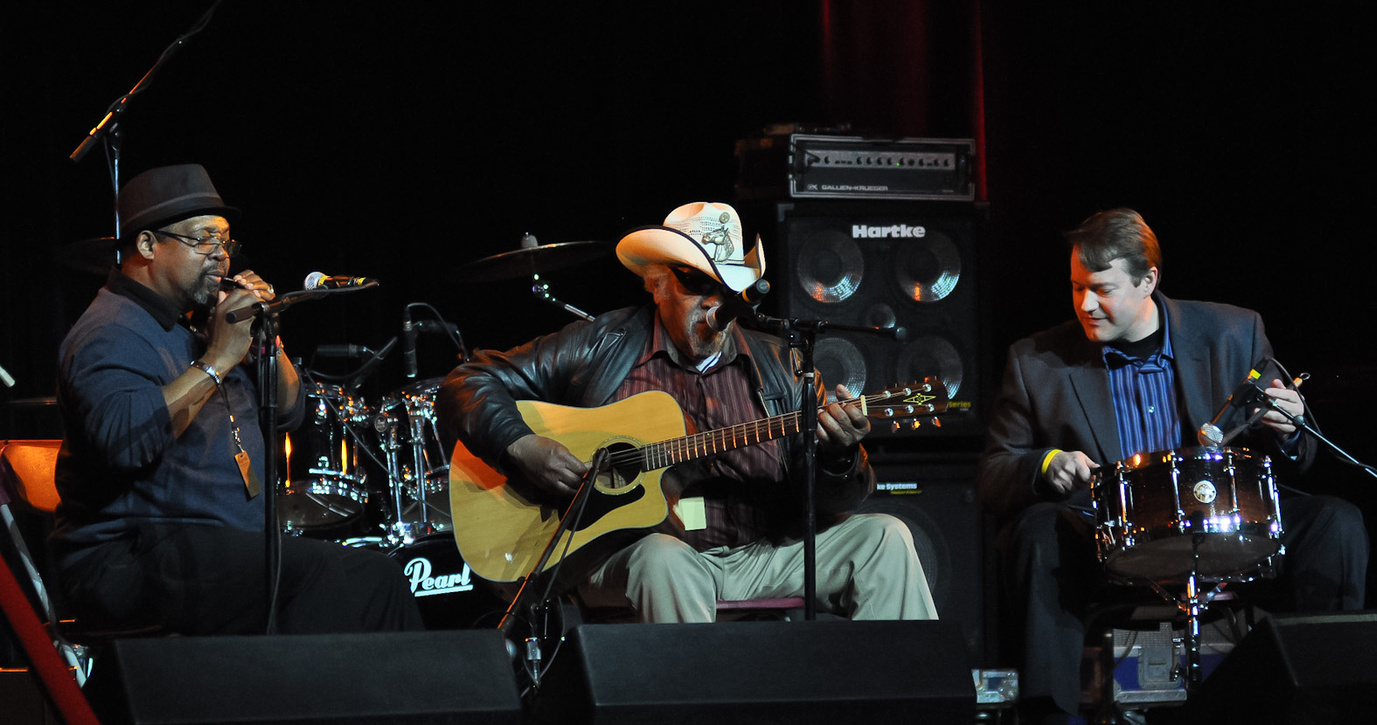
Little Bit A Blues performing in 2013: Summerour (left), Williams (center), Selby (right)

Little Bit a Blues is an American folk and blues trio comprising Warner Williams, Jay Summerour and Eric Selby, until Williams' death in 2021. They played at numerous folk and blues festivals and at concerts at the Smithsonian Institution in Washington, D.C., and were known for playing in the Piedmont blues style, a regional variant of the blues that developed in North Carolina, South Carolina, Virginia, Maryland and West Virginia.

== History ==
Williams and Summerour played music together under the name of Little Bit A Blues from the early 1990s. During their tenure together, they recorded several albums, including for the Smithsonian Folkways label. Eric Selby later joined up with Williams and Summerour, completing the trio.

Their recording, The Best of Little Bit a Blues: Live at B.B. King's Bluesville, on Soul Stew Records reached number one on the Blues411 chart, was nominated for a WAMMIE for Blues/Traditional R&B Recording of the Year as well as received a JIMI Award for Best Live Recording of the Year.

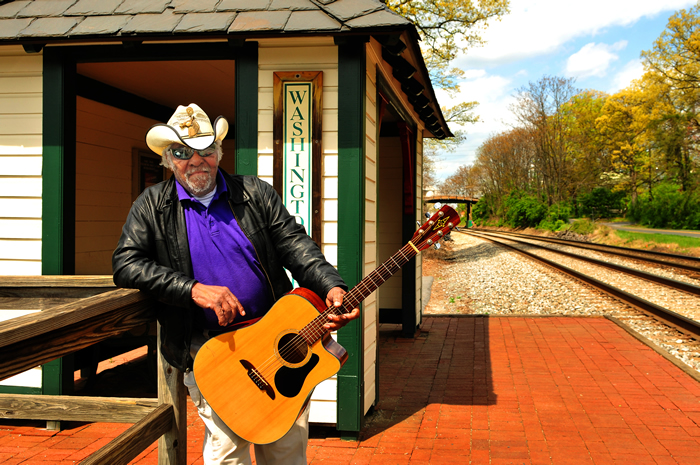
Williams in 2011

Williams was a recipient of a 2011 National Heritage Fellowship awarded by the National Endowment for the Arts, which is the United States government's highest honor in the folk and traditional arts.

Williams was from Takoma Park, Maryland, Summerour from Rockville, Maryland, and Selby from Washington Grove, Maryland. Williams died on September 20, 2021, aged 91.

== Discography ==
- Blues Highway (Smithsonian Folkways, 2004)
- Classic African-American Ballads (Smithsonian Folkways, 2006)
- The Best of Little Bit a Blues: Live at B.B. King's Bluesville (Soul Stew Records, 2013)
