= Maryland Classic Youth Orchestras =

Program in the Baltimore-Washington metropolitan area

- Also known as: MCYO
- Origin: Bethesda, Maryland
- Genre: Classical
- Years active: 1946-present
- Labels: Ster-Art, JNL Recordings
- Members: Executive Director; Cheryl Jukes; Artistic Director; Position Currently Vacant; Music Director; Position Currently Vacant
- Past members: Founder; Chester Petranek; Artistic Director Emerita; Olivia W. Gutoff
- Website: MCYO.org

Maryland Classic Youth Orchestras logo

The Maryland Classic Youth Orchestras (MCYO) is a youth orchestra program in the Baltimore-Washington metropolitan area. Along with the Baltimore Symphony Orchestra and the National Philharmonic, MCYO is affiliated with the Strathmore music center. MCYO's programs include a harp ensemble, several chamber ensembles, three string orchestras and three full orchestras. In total, MCYO consists of over 450 young musicians in grades 3 though 12.

MCYO was the impetus for starting the Gifted and Talented program run by the Maryland State Department of Education.

== History ==
Founded by Chester Petranek, former supervisor of music for the Montgomery County schools, in 1946. MCYO originally stood for Montgomery County Youth Orchestra, later changing to the current wording of Maryland Classic Youth Orchestras.

Currently there are over 400 young musicians involved in MCYO selected from over 1200 aspiring musicians.

== Orchestras ==
- The Preparatory Strings, a string orchestra for musicians in grades 3 through 5. Founded in 2010.
- The Chamber Strings, a string orchestra for musicians in grades 4 through 6. Founded in 1995 as the String Ensemble.
- The Concert Orchestra, a full orchestra for musicians in grades 6 through 8. Founded in 2025.
- The Young Artists, a full orchestra for musicians in grades 6 through 8. Founded in 1972 as the Prep Symphony.
- The Symphony, a full orchestra for musicians in grades 8 through 10. Founded in 1964 as the Junior Symphony.
- The Chamber Ensemble, a small string ensemble for musicians in grades 9 through 11. Founded in 2004 as the Sinfonia, and was the chamber orchestra until 2013.
- The Kamerata!, a string orchestra for musicians in grades 10 through 12. Founded in 2022.
- The Philharmonic, a full orchestra for musicians in grades 10 through 12. Founded in 1946 as the Senior Symphony.

== Small Ensembles ==
- Junior Flute Choir
- Senior Flute Choir
- Clarinet Choir
- Harp Ensemble
- Percussion Ensemble
- Tuba Euphonium Ensemble (TEE)
