= The Four Buddies =

American doo-wop music group

The Four Buddies were an American doo-wop group, based in Baltimore, Maryland. They recorded in the early to mid-1950s, and focused on melodious and laid-back ballads. Their biggest hit was "I Will Wait", and they recorded for Savoy Records.

Early pressings of "I Will Wait" b/w "Just to See You Smile Again" (Savoy 769) show artists' credit as "The Four Buds".

Members included Leon "Larry" Harrison, who went on to form a group in May 1953 called simply The Buddies; William "Tommy" Carter, Vernon "Bert" Palmer and John "Gregory" Carroll. Palmer and Carter were replaced in 1953, by Alvin Bowen and Maurice Hicks.

Roger Wainwright, Luther Dixon, and Danny Ferguson recorded with Harrison for Glory Records in 1955.
