= Baltimore City Colored Orchestra =

Orchestra founded in 1930 for African American musicians and audiences

The Baltimore City Colored Orchestra was an orchestra based out of Baltimore, Maryland, established for African American musicians and audiences. It was founded in 1930 under the direction of Charles L. Harris, with a grant from the city, and began performing in 1931. In 1933, W. Llewellyn Wilson, a prominent local music educator and author became conductor. The orchestra dissolved in 1939.
