= Michael Ricketts (musician) =

American rock musician, and songwriter (born 1965)

Background information
- Born: Michael David Ricketts; January 21, 1965 (age 60); College Park, Maryland, U.S.
- Genres: Metal (genre), Rock, Pop, Alternative rock
- Occupations: Guitarist, Songwriter, Producer
- Instruments: Vocals, Electric guitar, Acoustic guitar, Keyboard, Bass
- Years active: 1985 - present
- Website: alloy20rocks.com

Michael David Ricketts (born January 21, 1965, in College Park, Maryland) is an American rock musician, and songwriter. Guitarist for heavy metal rock band ALLOY20. Michael acted as primary recording engineer for their debut CD "ALLOY20 - Part I: Lost in the Veil of Darkness", released on October 20, 2012. Michael spends his spare time producing other acts and is also working on a solo project. He was co-founder and lead guitarist of the rock band Snydly Crunch. Snydly Crunch was featured on the 97-Underground compilation Album in 1987, and released "Revealed" in 1993. The band has performed with artists such as Pat Travers Band, Kix, and Mitch Allan with Honor Among Thieves on several occasions.

With the help of local producer and engineer Ray Tilkins, Snydly Crunch recorded the independent LP Revealed, released on SMARK Records on which Ricketts was co-writer and performed on guitars, keyboards, and backing vocals.

== Band members ==
=== Alloy20 members ===
- Jeff Grove - lead vocals
- Sean Taylor Brown - guitars
- Michael Ricketts - guitars
- John Taylor - bass guitars
- Billy Giddings - drums, percussion

=== Snydly Crunch members ===
- Michael Spelta - lead vocals, keyboards (1985–1989)
- Sean Patrick Mitchell - lead vocals (1991–1994)
- Andrew Faile - lead & rhythm guitars (1985–1994)
- Michael Ricketts - lead & rhythm guitars, keyboards, vocals (1985–1994)
- Steve Toth - drums, percussion (1985–1990)
- Karl Seiler - drums, percussion (1990–1994)

=== Session musicians ===
- Karen Teperberg - drums on Solo Debut (now with Jesse McCartney)

== Discography ==
=== Alloy20 ===
- Part I: Lost in the Veil of Darkness (2012)
  - Produced by Alloy20, Mixed by Kevin '131' Gutierrez, Mastered by Maor Appelbaum
  1. Demon of Destruction
  2. Silent Calls
  3. Veil of Darkness
  4. More to Give

=== Snydly Crunch ===
- Cue Sessions (1986)
  - Produced and Mixed by Jim Ebert
  1. Forgotten One
  2. Strike a Balance
  3. Vicious Obsession
  4. The Return
  5. Say Yes
  6. Fortitude
- 97 Underground Compilation (1987)
  - Produced by Derek Alan for PCA
  1. Hell's Gates - Artist Wrathchild with Shannon Larkin (now in Godsmack), and Brad Divens
  2. Then Comes The Night - Artist Snydly Crunch
  3. Burn The Sky - Artist Mystic Force
  4. Bad Attitude - Artist Shock Wave
  5. Nightmares - Artist Mona Lisa
  6. Found On The Highway Dead - Artist Chapelz
  7. Hot Seat - Artist Child's Play with John Allen (now in SR-71 (band))
  8. Scarlet Angel - Artist Scarlet Angel
- Revealed (1993)
  - Produced by Ray Tilkens and Snydly Crunch
  1. Cry Wolf
  2. Tomorrows Promise
  3. Dying To Survive
  4. The River
  5. Say Goodbye
  6. Love In Vain
  7. Spark Turns Into Flame
  8. I Feel Love
  9. Trusting Soul

== Stage work ==
Performed lead guitar for a stage production of The Rocky Horror Picture Show (DC, Summer 2003)

== Sources ==
LiveWire Magazine article - Snydly Crunch

Rox Magazine article - Snydly Crunch p1

Rox Magazine article - Snydly Crunch p2 'look here'

Listing of Snydly Crunch album - Revealed
