= Breathing Walker =

American experimental rock band

- Origin: Baltimore, Maryland, US
- Genres: Experimental rock, psychedelic rock
- Years active: 1990–1991
- Label: Vermin Scum
- Past members: Jonathan Vance; Mark Laurence; Alex Badertscher; Tim Horner; Zak Fusciello; Tonie Joy; Monica DiGialleonardo

Breathing Walker was an American experimental rock band formed by Moss Icon members including Jonathan Vance (vocals and lyrics) and Mark Laurence (drums), along with Alex Badertscher (bass), Tim Horner (violin), and Zak Fusciello (drums and percussion). The other members of Moss Icon, Tonie Joy (guitar) and Monica DiGialleonardo (bass) joined the band prior to their first live performance and recording session. After this short lived project, Alex Badertscher joined Moss Icon as a second guitarist. Breathing Walker only released one album, which was self-titled and released on the Vermin Scum record label.

== Discography ==
- Breathing Walker cassette (1990, Vermin Scum)
  - CD/LP reissue (2001, Vermin Scum)
