= Wakefield (band) =

American rock band (2000–2008)

- Origin: Mechanicsville, Maryland, USA
- Genres: Alternative rock; pop punk
- Years active: 2000–2008
- Labels: Arista; Jive; Zomba Music Group; iBot
- Past members: Ryan Escolopio; J.D. Tennyson; Mike Schoolden; Aaron Escolopio; Mark Martinez

Wakefield was an American pop-punk band from Maryland, formed in 2000. The band consisted of singer and guitarist Ryan Escolopio, his brother and drummer Aaron Escolopio, their cousin and bassist Mike Schoolden, and guitarist and main writer J.D. Tennyson.

== History ==
=== Early years ===
Ryan Escolopio, J.D. Tennyson, and Mike Schoolden formed the band with their friend Mark Martinez in 2000. In their early days, the band played clubs such as Piezano's Pizza, Wood's Holy Grounds in Severna Park, Maryland, and My Brother's Place in Waldorf, Maryland. In 2001 they supported Good Charlotte at a show sponsored by 99.1 WHFS. It took place at Arundel High School as a reward for a student food drive (headed by the Arundel Key Club). Aaron Escolopio joined after leaving Good Charlotte. Wakefield played their first show with Aaron at CBGB in New York on June 6, 2001.

During their early years, Wakefield was able to tour with Catch 22, The Mighty Mighty Bosstones, Allister, Riddlin' Kids, and others.

=== American Made (2003) ===
Wakefield announced on August 12, 2001, that they'd been signed to a record deal with Lava Records, a subsidiary of Atlantic Records, headed by Jason Flom. The band recorded a full album of their current songs at the A&M studios in California, but Wakefield was dropped before the album was released. The band was then signed by Arista Records, where they would release their debut album, American Made on May 6, 2003. American Made featured a combination of several new songs and older fan-favorite songs. In support of the album, Wakefield spent many months on the road, touring with bands including the All-American Rejects, Home Grown, Riddlin' Kids, and Reel Big Fish.

The first single off American Made was "Say You Will", a pop punk song that made it into the rotation of many rock music and Top 40 radio stations. The band also recorded a music video for the song, which received airplay mostly on MTV2 and Fuse. In June 2003, the video was voted as the Nickelodeon Video Pick of the Week and in Canada was featured on 'Oven Fresh'. They also produced a single for the video game Tak and the Power of Juju in October of 2003.

=== Which Side Are You On? (2005) ===
Wakefield made several appearances in pop culture following the success of American Made. Their cover of the Iggy Pop song "Real Wild Child" appeared on the soundtrack for Eurotrip, titled "Wild One". They also did a music video to "Wild One" for the extras on Tak and the Power of Juju.

The band also made an uncredited appearance in the Olsen twins movie New York Minute. Ryan, JD, and Mike appeared as the studio band for drummer Roxy (Mary-Kate Olsen), and Aaron appeared as the band's producer. The band recorded a cover of the David Bowie song "Suffragette City" for the New York Minute soundtrack.

Wakefield released their second and what would be their final studio album, titled Which Side Are You On? through Jive Records on January 6, 2005. The first single from the album was "C'mon Baby". Also appearing on the album is the song "After School Special" which was co-written with and produced by Butch Walker. The album had a number of producers and co-writers - Scott Cutler and John Fields to name a few. Which Side Are You On? also featured Ryan and JD's producing debut for "Clean 1145".

=== Reunion (2023) ===
Wakefield announced 20th anniversary reunion show for New Years Eve 2023 at The Rex in Leonardtown, Maryland.

== Discography ==
=== Albums ===
- American Made (2003)
- Which Side Are You On? (2005)
