= Brian Ganz =

American pianist

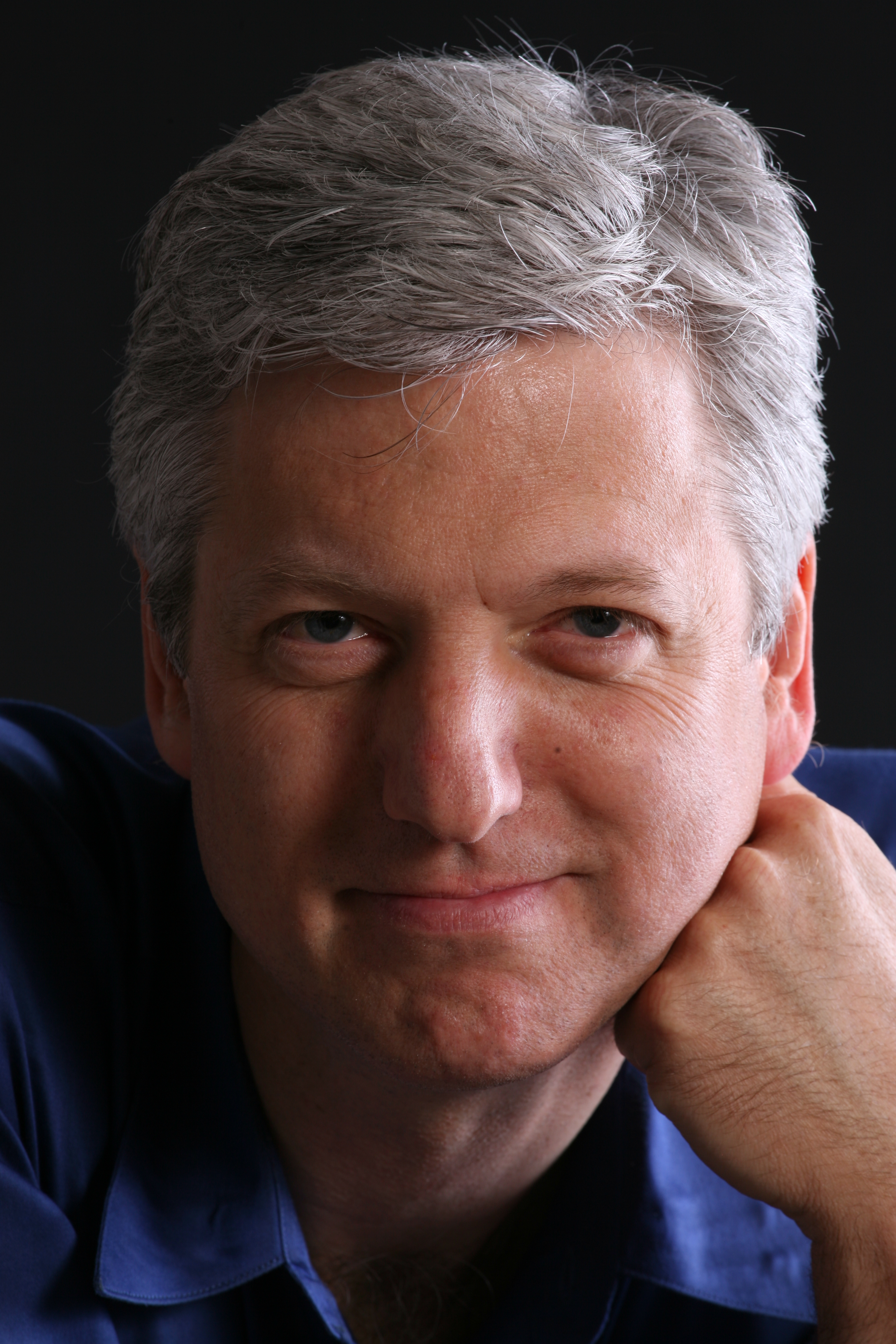
Brian Ganz

Brian Ganz is an American classical pianist recognized as one of the leading interpreters of the works of Frédéric Chopin. His career includes acclaimed performances, competition achievements, and teaching positions.

== Early career ==
Ganz began his piano studies in 1970 at the age of 9 with violinist and pianist Claire Deene. At 12 he joined the studio of acclaimed pedagogue Ylda Novik and began entering competitions and performing locally. In 1974, at the age of 14, he was a winner in the Baltimore Symphony concerto competition and performed with that orchestra under the baton of Darrold Hunt. In the following year Ganz began traveling the United States and performing with orchestras such as the Jefferson Symphony in Colorado, with whom he performed the Prokofiev Piano Concerto No. 3, and the Tuscarawas Philharmonic in Ohio, playing Gottschalk and Gershwin. He won first prize in a national Chopin competition hosted by the Chopin Singing Society of Buffalo, which earned Ganz a performance with the Buffalo Philharmonic of Grieg's Piano Concerto in A minor, and third prize in the Kościuszko Foundation International Chopin Competition in New York, both in 1976.

In 1977 Ganz was accepted into the private teaching studio of the pianist Leon Fleisher and continued to travel and perform. In that year he played the Grieg with the Baltimore Symphony under Fleisher's baton, the Prokofiev 3rd with the Florida West Coast Symphony, and Gershwin's Concerto in F with the National Symphony under the baton of Murry Sidlin. This last performance led to an invitation to perform the Prokofiev 3rd with the National Symphony at the Kennedy Center in the fall of 1977, under the baton of Arthur Fiedler.

In 1978, Ganz experienced a personal and professional crisis that led him to explore spiritual teachings. He began studying A Course in Miracles, published by the Foundation for Inner Peace in 1976. He has credited the book with helping him manage personal and professional challenges and has continued to study its teachings. Around this time, he stepped back from pursuing a solo concert career, focusing instead on collaborative performance, teaching, and private study. He accompanied vocalists and instrumentalists, performed chamber music, and spent time in meditation and spiritual study. During this period, he enrolled at the Catholic University of America, though he did not take music courses. In 1985, after several years away from solo performance, Ganz resumed preparation for a solo concert career. He entered the Beethoven Fellowship Auditions sponsored by the American Pianists Association in 1989 and was awarded one of the three fellowships. He also reconnected with his former teacher, Leon Fleisher, who was a member of the audition jury. Ganz rejoined Fleisher's studio at the Peabody Conservatory, where he earned an Artist Diploma in 1993 and later became Fleisher's teaching assistant. In 1989, Ganz shared first prize at the Marguerite Long–Jacques Thibaud International Piano Competition and won third prize at the 1991 Queen Elisabeth Competition in Belgium. These results led to international performance engagements with orchestras in Belgium, Italy, France, the United Kingdom, the Netherlands, Japan, South Korea, and the Philippines.

== Performances and collaborations ==
Ganz has appeared as a soloist with major orchestras throughout the world, including the St. Louis Symphony, the St. Petersburg Philharmonic, the Baltimore Symphony, the National Symphony Orchestra (USA), the National Philharmonic, the City of London Sinfonia, and the Taipei Philharmonic Orchestra. He has performed with such conductors as Leonard Slatkin, Marin Alsop, Mstislav Rostropovich, Piotr Gajewski, Jerzy Semkow and Yoel Levi.

== Critical reception ==
The Washington Post has described Ganz's performances as compelling, noting that "One comes away from a recital by pianist Brian Ganz not only exhilarated by the power of the performance but also moved by his search for artistic truth." La Libre Belgique, a Belgian newspaper, noted his passionate and authentic musicianship, stating, "We don't have the words to speak of this fabulous musician who lives music with a generous urgency and brings his public into a state of intense joy.

== Chopin project ==
In January 2011, Ganz embarked on a multi-year project with the National Philharmonic to perform the complete works of Chopin at the Music Center at Strathmore. The project has received consistent critical acclaim, with The Washington Post noting his "masterly" playing during the inaugural recital. In February 2025, Ganz performed the series' 14th and penultimate recital, with the final recital scheduled for April 11, 2026.

== Teaching and publications ==
Ganz serves as artist-in-residence and a member of the piano faculty at St. Mary's College of Maryland, where he has taught since 1986. In 2021, he retired after 21 years on the Conservatory faculty of the Peabody Institute of Johns Hopkins University. Ganz is the artist-editor of the Schirmer Performance Edition of Chopin's Preludes (2005).

== Performances ==
Notable recent performances include Chopin's Piano Concerto No. 2 at the Alba Music Festival in Italy and with the National Philharmonic at the Music Center at Strathmore, Mozart's Piano Concerto K. 488 with the Annapolis Symphony both in Annapolis and at Strathmore, Beethoven's 4th Piano Concerto with the Virginia Chamber Orchestra at the recently opened Capital One Hall, and Beethoven's "Emperor" Concerto with the Billings Symphony.

== Other artistic activities ==
In September 2019, Ganz debuted as an actor and playwright at the Smithsonian's National Museum of Asian Art, Freer and Sackler Galleries. The performance featured an imagined dialogue between the American painter James McNeill Whistler, played by actor Michael Tolaydo, and a musician character, played by Ganz, examining thematic links between Whistler's "10 O'Clock Lecture" and the music of Claude Debussy. The production, entitled "Whistler, Debussy and the Lecture That Changed Art", combined excerpts from Whistler's lecture with Ganz's live performances of works by Debussy and composers influenced by him.

== Discography and recordings ==
Brian Ganz has released several recordings, including Chopin's Preludes on the Maestoso label and Ballades on the Accord label. On the latter label, he also released the complete works for solo piano of the French composer Henri Dutilleux.
