= Herbert Greenberg =

American Violinist

Violinist Herbert Greenberg is an American concertmaster, soloist, and chamber musician. He studied with Jascha Brodsky, Ivan Galamian, and Josef Gingold. Additionally, he earned a performer's certificate at Indiana University.

Greenberg has been part of the Minnesota Orchestra, served as associate concertmaster of the Pittsburgh Symphony, and was the concertmaster of the Baltimore Symphony Orchestra for 20 seasons.

As a guest concertmaster, Greenberg has performed with the Houston, St. Louis, San Diego, and Oregon Symphonies, the National Arts Centre Orchestra of Canada, and the Bergen Philharmonic Orchestra in Norway. He was the first American to serve as concertmaster for the Japan Virtuoso Symphony Orchestra, an ensemble of top players from Japan and major European and Israeli orchestras. He has also toured as a soloist with the Aalborg Symphony Orchestra of Denmark and conducted the New Arts Ensemble of Taipei throughout Taiwan.

Greenberg co-founded the Previn-Greenberg-Williams Trio in Pittsburgh and the Baltimore String Quartet. He has collaborated with musicians such as William Primrose, Josef Gingold, Jaime Laredo, Pinchas Zukerman, Malcolm Frager, Leonard Rose, and Yo-Yo Ma. His festival appearances include the New York String Seminar, NOI, Sarasota, Summit, and Blossom Festivals, and he has been part of the Aspen Music Festival and School faculty, serving as concertmaster for fifteen seasons.

Since 1987, Greenberg has been a faculty member at the Peabody Conservatory, where he has held various leadership roles, including String Chair, Faculty Chair, and Coordinator of the Violin Department. He has led masterclasses at institutions such as LSU, CCM, YST, and Juilliard. His students hold positions in various symphony orchestras worldwide, including those in Baltimore, Cleveland, Chicago, Philadelphia, San Francisco, Pittsburgh, the National Symphony, Kennedy Center Opera, Houston, St. Louis, Montreal, KBS, Danish Radio, and the Israel Philharmonic.

Greenberg has recorded for Sony, Telarc, Argo, and Delos, and he performs on the 1685 Jean Becker Stradivarius.
