= Florestan Club =

The Florestan Club was a social club in Baltimore, Maryland. They founded the Baltimore Symphony Orchestra in 1915, ensuring that it was municipally-funded.

Members included H. L. Mencken.
