= Glover (surname) =

Glover is an English occupational surname derived from the Old French word "glover," which means "glove maker."

Notable people with the surname include:

- Ablade Glover (born 1934), Ghanaian artist
- Albert Glover (1849–1941), New Zealand politician
- Alexa Glover (1882–1933), Scottish golfer
- Alfred Glover (1872–1949), English cricketer
- Allan Glover (born 1950), English footballer
- Allan C. Glover (1900–1984), South Australian artist
- Amanda Glover (born 1970), British beach volleyball player
- Ames Glover (born 1989), English child missing since 1990
- Andrew Glover (born 1967), American football player
- Angela Glover Blackwell (born 1944 or 1945), American attorney, civil rights advocate, and author
- Angus Glover (born 1998), Australian basketball player
- Ann Glover, or Annie Glover (died 1688), Irish washerwoman, the last woman hanged as a witch in Boston
- Anne Glover (disambiguation), multiple people
- Anthony Glover (born 1979), basketball player
- Anwan Glover (born 1971), musical artist
- Archibald Edward Glover (1859–1954), British Protestant missionary in China
- Audrey Glover, British lawyer, election observer
- Barney Glover (born 1958), Australian academic and politician
- Ben Glover (born 1978), songwriter and producer
- Maude Edith Victoria Glover-Fleay (1869–1965), Australian wildlife artist
- Bev Glover (1926–2000), English footballer
- Beverley Glover (born 1972), British biologist
- Bill Glover (born 1952), American drummer and musician
- Billy Glover (1896–1962), English footballer
- Boakyewaa Glover (born 1979), Ghanaian author
- Bob Glover, American running coach and author
- Boyer Glover (fl. 1758–1771), English watch and clock maker
- Brandon Glover (born 1997), Dutch cricketer
- Brian Glover (1934–1997), British actor
- Broc Glover (born 1960), American motocross racer
- Bruce Glover (1932–2025), American actor
- Caden Glover (born 2007), American soccer player
- Calvin N. Glover, American murderer
- Candice Glover (born 1989), winner of season 12 of American Idol
- Carl Glover (born 1952), British motorcyclist
- Carol J. Clover (born 1940), American professor
- Caroline Glover, American chef
- Caroline Gilman Glover, first married name of Caroline Howard Jervey, American writer
- Cat Glover (born 1964), choreographer and dancer
- Cedric Glover (born 1965), American politician
- Charles Glover (disambiguation), multiple people
- Chris Glover (born 1961), Canadian politician
- Clarence Glover (born 1947), American basketball player
- Clifford Glover, of Killing of Clifford Glover by police in New York City
- Corey Glover (born 1964), American singer, vocalist of Living Colour
- Crispin Glover (born 1964), American actor and painter
- Crispin J. Glover, British DJ
- Cyrus Herbert Glover, known as Bert Glover (1887–1941), Australian rules footballer
- Dana Karl Glover (born 1958), musician and composer
- Dana Glover (singer) (born 1974), singer and songwriter
- Daniel Nii Kwartei Titus Glover (born 1966), Ghanaian politician
- Danny Glover (born 1946), American actor
- Danny Glover (footballer) (born 1989), English footballer
- David Glover (disambiguation), multiple people
- Dean Glover (born 1963), English football manager and former player
- Denis Glover (1912–1980), New Zealand poet
- Dennis Glover, Australian writer
- Dion Glover (born 1978), American basketball player
- Don Edward Glover (born 1944), American politician
- Donald Glover (born 1983), American actor, comedian, and rapper
- Douglas Glover (disambiguation), multiple people
- Edmund Glover (1813–1860), British actor, artist, and manager
- Edward Glover (disambiguation), multiple people named Edward or Ed
- Elaine Glover (born 1982), English actress, singer, and chef
- Elbert Glover (born 1945), American author and researcher
- Eli Sheldon Glover (1844–1920), American artist and publisher
- Elias Glover of Elias Glover Woolen Mill, textile mill owner
- Elizabeth Glover (1602–1643), English colonist
- Elwood Glover (1915–1990), Canadian broadcaster
- Ernest Glover (disambiguation), multiple people
- Fi Glover (born 1970), BBC journalist
- Frank Glover (born 1963), American jazz musician
- Fred Glover (disambiguation), multiple people
- Gary Glover (born 1976), American baseball player
- Gary H. Glover, American electrical engineer
- George Glover (disambiguation), multiple people
- Gerry Glover (born 1946), English footballer
- Glenda Glover, American educator
- Gordon Glover (1908–1975), British writer
- Graham Glover, law professor
- Greg Glover, founder of Arena Rock Recording Company
- Guy Glover (1910–1988), Canadian film producer
- Harry Glover (disambiguation), multiple people
- Helen Glover (Survivor contestant) (born 1955), contestant on American reality TV show
- Helen Glover (born 1986), Olympic gold medal rower
- Henry Glover (1921–1991), American songwriter, arranger, record producer and trumpeter
- Henry H. Glover (1827–1904), Australian artist and lithographer, son of Harry
- Horace Glover (1883–1967), English footballer
- Howie Glover (1935–2021), Canadian hockey player
- Ian Glover (born 1978), English snooker player
- Jack Glover (disambiguation), multiple people
- James Glover (disambiguation), multiple people
- Jamie Glover (born 1969), British actor
- Jane Cocking Glover (1789–1876), English-born American socialite and poet
- Jane Glover (born 1949), British conductor
- Jay Glover (born 2003), English footballer
- Jean Glover (1758–1801), Scottish poet, actress and singer
- Jeff Glover (born 1983), American martial artist
- Jesse Glover (1935–2012), American martial artist
- Jim Glover (born 1942), American folk musician
- Jimmy Glover (1861–1931), Irish composer and conductor
- John Glover (disambiguation), multiple people
- John William Glover (1815–1899), Irish composer
- Jonathan Glover (born 1941), British philosopher
- Jose Glover (died 1638), English minister and pioneer of printing in the New World
- Joseph Glover, American professor, Provost for the University of Florida
- Joshua Glover, runaway slave; tested Fugitive Slave Law in Wisconsin
- Juleanna Glover (born 1969), former White House press secretary
- Julia Glover (1779–1850), Irish-born actress
- Julian Glover (born 1935), British actor
- Julian Glover (journalist), English journalist and speechwriter
- Keith Glover, British electrical engineer
- Kevin Glover (born 1963), American football player and administrator
- Khaliq Glover, music mixer and producer
- Kim Glover, British music manager
- Koda Glover (born 1993), American baseball player
- Larry Glover, American sportscaster
- Lavar Glover (born 1978), American gridiron football player, coach, and administrator
- La'Roi Glover (born 1974), American football player
- Lee Glover (born 1970), British footballer
- Lenny Glover (born 1944), English footballer
- Lorri Glover, American scholar
- Louise Glover (born 1983), British model
- Lucas Glover (born 1979), American professional golfer
- Lucy Glover (born 1998), British rower
- Macario Hing-Glover (born 1995), American soccer player
- Mackenzie Glover (born 1998), Canadian swimmer
- Mae Glover (1906–1985), American blues singer
- Maggie Wallace Glover (born 1948), American politician
- Marewa Glover, New Zealand public health academic
- Mark L. Grover (born 1947), American theologian
- Martin Glover (born 1960), record producer
- Mary Glover, first married name of Mary Baker Eddy (1821–1910)
- Matthew Glover, British businessman and animal rights activist
- Melvin Glover (born 1961), hip hop artist better known as Melle Mel
- Michael Glover (disambiguation), multiple people
- Mike Glover (disambiguation), multiple people
- Montague Glover (1898–1983), British photographer and architect
- Montego Glover (born 1974), American actress
- Moses Glover (born 1601, fl. 1620–1640), English cartographer
- Nancy Glover (1910–1986), a married name of Nancy Lyle, British tennis player
- Nat Glover (born 1943), American sheriff
- Nathaniel Glover Jr., member of hip-hop group Grandmaster Flash and the Furious Five
- Nate Glover, the singer Kid Creole (rapper)
- Nedra Glover Tawwab, American mental health therapist and writer
- Neville Glover (1955–2026), Australian rugby league footballer
- Nigel Glover (born 1961), British particle physicist
- Olly Glover, British politician
- Pat Glover (1910–1971), Welsh footballer
- Patrick Glover (born 1944), British Christian clergyman
- Paul Glover (disambiguation), multiple people
- Peter Glover (disambiguation), multiple people
- Phil Glover (born 1975), American football player
- Philip Glover (1894–1957), English tennis player
- Pia Glover-Rolle (born 1977), Bahamian politician
- Raishad Glover (born c. 1980), American artist
- Randy Glover (born 1941), American golfer
- Richard Glover (disambiguation), multiple people
- Robbie Glover (singer), English singer-songwriter
- Robert Glover (disambiguation), multiple people
- Roger Glover (born 1945), Welsh bass player and songwriter with Deep Purple
- Ross Glover (born 1964), New Zealand cricketer
- Ruby Glover (1929–2007), American jazz singer
- Rusty Glover (born 1966), American politician
- Ryan Glover (born 2000), English footballer
- Sam Glover (born 1901), Australian rules footballer
- Sandra Glover (born 1968), African-American athlete
- Sandra Slack Glover (born 1970/1971), American lawyer
- Sarah Anna Glover (1786–1867), English music editor
- Savion Glover (born 1973), American actor, tap dancer, and choreographer
- Shawn Glover (born 1990), American basketball player
- Shelly Glover (born 1967), Canadian politician
- Stanley Glover (1908–1964), Canadian athlete
- Stephen Glover (disambiguation), several people named "Steven", "Stephen", "Steve"
- Sue Glover (singer), stage name of singer Yvonne "Sue" Weetman of Sue and Sunny
- Susan Glover, Canadian actress
- Sybil Mullen Glover (1908–1995), British artist
- Tammy Glover, American drummer
- Tay Glover-Wright (born 1992), American gridiron football player
- Ted Glover (1911–1967), English cricketer
- Teddy Glover (1902–1993), American soccer player
- Terrot R. Glover (1869–1943), British Classics scholar
- Thaddeus B. Glover (1852–1932), American colonial officer
- Thomas Glover (disambiguation), multiple people
- Tim Glover, Manx politician
- Titus Glover (1974–2009), American rapper
- Tom Glover (disambiguation), multiple people
- Tony Glover (1939–2019), American blues musician and music critic
- Townend Glover (1813–1883), American entomologist
- Travis Glover (born 2000), American football player
- Trevor Glover (born 1951), English cricketer and rugby union player
- Trilby Glover, Australian actress
- Valerie Glover, Australian artist
- Vicky Glover, Scottish boxer
- Victor Glover (disambiguation), multiple people
- Vivette Glover (born 1942), British psychologist
- Vivian Glover (born 1947), American writer and television producer
- Will Glover, American musician
- Willey Glover Denis (1879–1929), American biochemist and physiologist
- William Glover (disambiguation), multiple people
- Zara Glover, British ten-pin bowler

== See also ==
- Glover (disambiguation)
