= John Glover =

John Glover may refer to:

== Artists ==
- John Glover (actor) (born 1944), American actor
- John Glover (artist) (1767–1849), English-Australian painter
- John William Glover (1815–1899), Irish composer

== Politicians ==
- John Glover (MP), cloth merchant and member of the Parliament of England
- John Montgomery Glover (1822–1891), U.S. Representative from Missouri and Civil War cavalry colonel
- John Milton Glover (1852–1929), U.S. Representative from Missouri
- John Glover (New Zealand politician) (1866–1947), first secretary of the New Zealand Labour Party
- John Glover (mayor), mayor of Queenstown-Lakes District in New Zealand

== Sports ==
- John Glover (cricketer, born 1989), Welsh cricketer
- John Glover (cricketer, born 1992), English cricketer
- John Glover (footballer) (1876–1955), English footballer

== Others ==
- Charles John Glover, known as Sir John Glover, Lord Mayor of Adelaide 1960–1963, see List of mayors and lord mayors of Adelaide
- John Glover (preacher) (1714–1774), English preacher
- John Glover (general) (1732–1797), American general
- John Glover (late 18th century), American soldier and pioneer who first settled Greensburg, Kentucky
- John Hawley Glover (1829–1885), British naval captain
- John Wayne Glover (1932–2005), Australian serial killer
- Jonathan Glover (born 1941), British philosopher
- John Corbett Glover (1909–1949), Catholic priest
- John "Cockey" Glover was lynched by a mob after shooting Deputy Sheriff Walter C. Byrd

== See also ==
- Jon Glover (born 1952), British actor
- John Roberts, Chief Judge of the Supreme Court of the United States, whose middle name is Glover
