= James Glover =

James Glover may refer to:

- James Alcorn Glover (1866–1915), lawyer and state legislator in Mississippi
- James Alison Glover (1874–1963), British physician
- James N. Glover (1837–1921), founding father of Spokane, Washington, USA
- James Waterman Glover (1868–1941), American mathematician, statistician, and actuary
- James Glover (British Army officer) (1929–2000), British general
- James Glover (rugby league), rugby league footballer
- Jimmy Glover, Irish composer, conductor, music critic, and journalist
- Jamie Glover, English actor
