= Merton Sandler =

Merton Sandler FRCP FRCPath FRCPsych
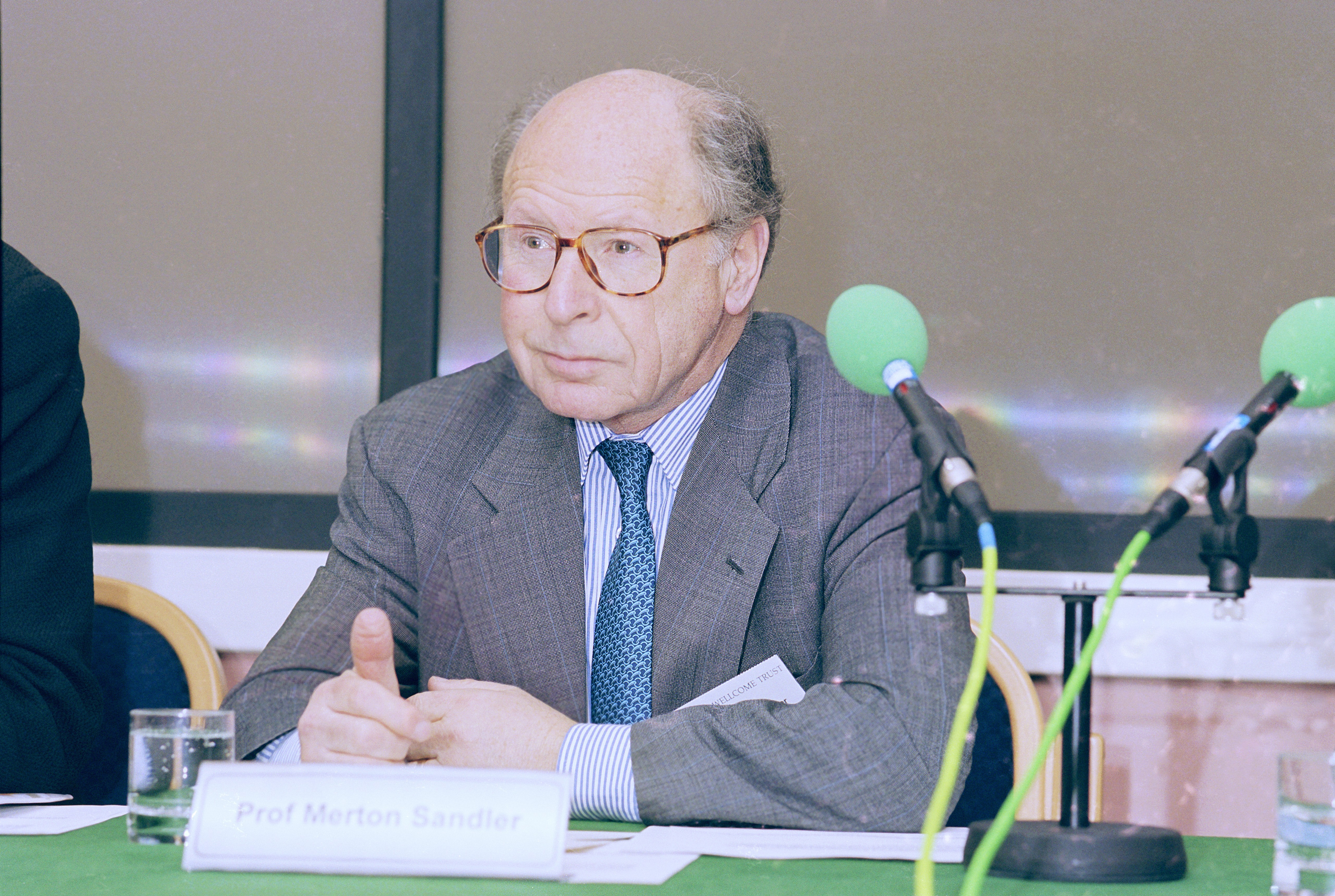
- Sandler in March 1997
- Born: 28 March 1926; Salford, United Kingdom
- Died: 24 August 2014 (aged 88); London, United Kingdom
- Education: University of Manchester
- Known for: Monoamine hypothesis of depression Deprenyl treatment for Parkinson's disease Discovery of tribulin
- Spouse: Lorna Grenby (m. 1961)
- Children: 4
- Awards: CINP Pioneer Award (2006)
- Scientific career
- Fields: Chemical pathology Biological psychiatry Psychopharmacology
- Institutions: Queen Charlotte's Hospital; University of London

Merton Sandler FRCP, FRCPath, FRCPsych (28 March 1926 to 24 August 2014) was a British professor of chemical pathology and a pioneer in biological psychiatry. Together with his colleague Michael Pare, he formulated an early version of the monoamine hypothesis of depression in 1959. They proposed that the condition results from a deficiency of monoamine neurotransmitters in the brain, and this work contributed to the development of modern antidepressants. He also demonstrated that deprenyl (selegiline) was a safe and effective treatment for Parkinson's disease, and he produced influential research on migraine, alcoholism and schizophrenia. Over the course of his career he published more than 700 scientific papers, many of which became citation classics.

== Early life and education ==
Sandler was born in Salford, Lancashire, into an observant Jewish family. His father, Frank Sandler, owned a small business, and his mother was Edith Sandler (née Stein). He won a scholarship to the Manchester Grammar School and then studied medicine at the University of Manchester, qualifying in 1949.

== Career ==
=== Early career and National Service ===
After qualifying, Sandler held house posts in Manchester and then worked as a resident pathologist at Preston Royal Infirmary. From 1951 to 1953 he carried out his National Service as a junior specialist in pathology in the Royal Army Medical Corps, attaining the rank of Captain. During this period he and Michael Pare, who was also serving in the corps, published their first joint paper in The Lancet, and Pare became a lifelong friend and collaborator.

After completing his National Service, Sandler became a research fellow in clinical pathology at the Brompton Hospital from 1953 to 1954. There he helped to investigate one of the first cases of carcinoid syndrome recorded in Britain, which drew him into the study of serotonin metabolism. In 1955 he was appointed a lecturer in chemical pathology at the Royal Free Hospital School of Medicine. In 1958 he became a consultant in chemical pathology at Queen Charlotte's Maternity Hospital, a post he held until 1991. He had originally taken the position in order to study the role of serotonin in pre-eclampsia, but he disproved his own hypothesis within six months and afterwards devoted himself to broader research on monoamines.

From 1973 to 1991, Sandler was Professor of Chemical Pathology at the Institute of Obstetrics and Gynaecology, University of London, becoming Professor Emeritus on his retirement in 1991. He held visiting professorships at the University of New Mexico in 1983, the Chicago Medical School in 1984, and the University of South Florida in 1988. He was a Fellow Emeritus of the American College of Neuropsychopharmacology.

=== The monoamine hypothesis of depression ===
In 1959, at a time when most psychiatry was psychoanalytic rather than biological, Sandler and the psychiatrist Michael Pare proposed that depression might result from a deficit of monoamines such as serotonin, noradrenaline and dopamine in the brain. Their proposal grew out of a clinical trial of iproniazid, a drug that had been reported to inhibit the enzyme monoamine oxidase. When the researchers blocked the enzyme, which is responsible for the breakdown of these monoamines, they were able to demonstrate an improvement in mood. The resulting work, which became known as the monoamine hypothesis, developed into one of the most influential theories in psychiatry and contributed to the development of modern antidepressants.

Sandler continued to research monoamine oxidase for the rest of his working life. Working with Moussa Youdim, he provided evidence that the enzyme exists in multiple forms in the brain, a finding that carried important pharmacological implications. He was also a pioneer in the application of gas chromatography–mass spectrometry to the analysis of biogenic amines. From 1976 to 1991 he ran a National Monoamine Reference Laboratory Service.

=== Parkinson's disease and deprenyl ===
Sandler and his colleagues demonstrated that dopamine is the substrate of monoamine oxidase B in the human brain, and this finding led directly to the clinical use of deprenyl (selegiline), a selective inhibitor of that enzyme, in the treatment of Parkinson's disease. The key early clinical results were published with the neurologist Andrew Lees and Gerald Stern in The Lancet in 1977. His team further showed that deprenyl did not produce the tyramine reaction, commonly called the "cheese effect", that is associated with other monoamine oxidase inhibitors, which established the drug's safety profile. Deprenyl remains in widespread clinical use for Parkinson's disease.

=== Tribulin ===
Sandler's research group identified an endogenous monoamine oxidase inhibitor, which they named tribulin. They found that the compound was elevated in conditions of stress and anxiety. The monoamine oxidase B inhibitory component of tribulin was later identified as isatin. This research included studies carried out at HM Prison Wormwood Scrubs, where Sandler's team compared monoamine oxidase activity in violent offenders with that in non-violent prisoners.

=== Migraine ===
Sandler carried out research into the biochemical basis of migraine at a time when the condition was widely regarded as psychosomatic. His work examined dietary triggers, including the role of tyramine and other amines found in foods and alcoholic beverages. The research was recognised with a Gold Medal from the British Migraine Association in 1974. He later chaired the scientific advisory committee of the Migraine Trust and served as one of its trustees.

=== Professional organisations and publications ===
Sandler was a co-founder of the British Association for Psychopharmacology (BAP) in 1974, together with David Wheatley and Alec Coppen. The organisation was originally called the British Academy of Psychopharmacology, and it held its inaugural meeting on 22 April 1974 at the Royal Society of Medicine. Sandler served as the association's president from 1980 to 1982.

He was instrumental in the founding of the Association for Post-Natal Illness in 1979, at a time when postnatal depression carried considerable social stigma, and he served as its life president until his death.

Sandler was a prolific editor. He served as joint editor-in-chief of the Journal of Psychiatric Research from 1982 to 1993, was a joint editor of the British Journal of Pharmacology, Clinical Science and the Journal of Neural Transmission, and sat on the editorial boards of numerous other scientific journals. He edited many books, on subjects including the psychopharmacology of aggression, alcohol and food, migraine, monoamine oxidase, and the science of wine. In 1992 he received an honorary doctorate from Semmelweis University in Budapest.

Among his long-standing collaborators was Vivette Glover, professor of perinatal psychobiology at Imperial College London, who worked with him for more than 30 years on monoamine oxidase and tribulin research. Many of his former students and protégés went on to hold their own chairs and to head departments at universities around the world.

=== Soviet Jewry ===
During the Soviet antisemitic persecution of the 1960s and 1970s, Sandler used his contacts within the USSR scientific establishment to assist Jewish neuroscientists behind the Iron Curtain. He helped to arrange visits abroad for Soviet Jewish scientists, which were forbidden at the time, and he assisted some of them in emigrating to the West and finding work there. Because he was one of the relatively few Western scientists who maintained contact with Soviet colleagues during the Cold War, he came under scrutiny from both the Russian and the British authorities.

== Personal life ==
Sandler married Lorna Grenby, a simultaneous interpreter, in 1961, and they had four children: Martin, Livy, Nick, and Dido.

He was an active Freemason. He was initiated in 1954 in the In Arduis Fidelis Lodge (London) and, two years later, in the Holy Royal Arch. He belonged to several lodges and chapters, and he held office in the United Grand Lodge of England.

He was a member of the Athenaeum Club, and his recreations included reading, music and travel.

Sandler died in London on 24 August 2014.

== Awards ==
- Anna Monika Prize (jointly) for research on biological aspects of depression (1973)
- Gold Medal, British Migraine Association (1974)
- Senator Dr Franz Burda International Prize for Research on Parkinson's Disease (1988)
- Arnold Friedman Distinguished Clinician Researcher Award (1991)
- Honorary doctorate, Semmelweis University, Budapest (1992)
- British Association for Psychopharmacology Lifetime Achievement Award (1999)
- CINP Pioneer Award for lifetime contribution to monoamine studies in human health and disease (2006)
