= William Glover =

William Glover may refer to:

- William Glover (MP for Weymouth), MP for Weymouth in 1394
- William Glover (fl. 1397), MP for Dartmouth
- William Glover (MP) (1559–1629), English politician
- William Glover (North Carolina politician) (1653–1713), acting deputy governor of the province of North Carolina
- William Howard Glover (1819–1875), English musical composer and writer
- William Glover (artist) (1836–1916), Scottish artist and theatre manager
- William Glover Joy (fl. 1855–1856), builder of Moorfield House, Headingley, Leeds, England
- Billy Glover (1896–1962), English footballer
- William Elwood Glover (1915–1990), Canadian radio and television broadcaster
- Bill Glover (born 1952), Christian musician
- Little Bill Glover, protagonist of Little Bill, an American animated children's television series

== See also ==
- Charles William Glover (1806–1863), violinist and composer
- William Glover Joy
