= Harry Glover =

Harry Glover may refer to:

- Harry Glover (artist), English artist in South Australia

- Henry H. Glover, his son, Australian artist, also called Harry

- Harry Glover (rugby union), English rugby union player
