= Glover =

Glover may refer to:

- A maker of gloves

== Places ==
In the United States:

- Glover, Missouri
- Glover, North Dakota
- Glover, Vermont, a New England town
  - Glover (CDP), Vermont, the main village in the town
- Glover, Wisconsin
- Glover's Rock, New York, the rock where John Glover allegedly stood during the Battle of Pell's Point in the American Revolutionary War

== Other uses ==
- Glover (surname)
- Glover (video game)
- Yeovil Town F.C., an association football club nicknamed the "Glovers"
- A performer of gloving, is a form of modern dance
