= Drury Lane pantomime =

Tradition at the Theatre Royal, Drury Lane, London, England

Preparations for the pantomime by set designer William Beverly. This illustration was drawn by Frederic Villiers and published in 1874.

Drury Lane pantomime is a long tradition at the Theatre Royal, Drury Lane, dating from the early 18th century. In every Christmas season, a pantomime is produced which has a leading place among the many other pantomimes of the capital. Other pantomimes are sometimes produced during the rest of the year. Pantomime Theatre is a family-friendly genre of stage performance that includes cross dressing actors performing songs, dances, skits, and slapstick comedy.

== History ==
The origins of pantomime at Drury Lane can be traced back to sixteenth century commedia dell'arte’s stock character Arlecchino. Three Hundred years before the birth of Pantomime, this tricky servant was best known for his lighthearted nimbleness, zany personality, crude expression of sexuality, and physical agility. John Weaver, known as the Father of Modern Pantomime, premiered a version of Arlecchino's act at Drury Lane Theatre in 1702. The first English pantomime was Tavern Bilkers performed at Drury Lane in 1702. This started a popular tradition in which the annual Christmas pantomime at Drury Lane was the foremost entertainment of this kind. The thirty seven pantomimes in the years 1852 to 1888 were all written by E.L. Blanchard.

From 1893 to 1923, most of the music for the Drury Lane pantomimes was arranged by Jimmy Glover (1861–1931), Director of Music .
