= David Glover =

David Glover may refer to:

- David Glover (geneticist) (born 1948), British geneticist
- D. D. Glover (David Delano Glover, 1868–1952), politician
- David Carr Glover (1925–1988), American pianist
- David Glover (actor) (1927–2015), English television actor
- David Glover (The Inbetweeners)
