= John Corbett Glover =

Australian priest (1909–1949)

- Diocese: Diocese of Wagga Wagga

Orders
- Ordination: 6 January 1932 by Joseph Wilfrid Dwyer
- Rank: Priest

Personal details
- Born: 4 July 1909 Perth, Western Australia
- Died: 1 January 1949 (aged 39) Mingende, Papua New Guinea
- Denomination: Catholic
- Military career
- Service: Australian Army
- Service years: 1942-1946
- Rank: Lieutenant
- Service number: NGX304

John Corbett Glover (4 July 1909 – 1 January 1949 was an Australian Catholic priest and missionary. He led the evacuation efforts to rescue nearly 100 people from Kainantu after the Japanese invaded New Guinea in 1942.

== Early life ==
Glover was born in Perth, Western Australia, to Mr. and Mrs. William Hyde Glover. He had three sisters and two brothers, and was the eldest son. His brother Kevin also joined the priesthood. The family lived in Whorouly, and he received his primary education at the Christian Brothers' College, Albury, and later attended the Ecclesiastical College at Manly. His parents later owned the Royal Hotel in Albury.

Glover was ordained to the priesthood on 6 January 1932 at St Patrick's Church, Albury, by Bishop Joseph Wilfrid Dwyer of Wagga. In 1936, he was transferred from Gundagai to Cootamundra, where he was parish priest. He learnt to fly with Butler Air Transport while in Cootamundra and was posted to New Guinea with the Divine Word Mission in 1938. He began flying aircraft for the Mission in 1940, eventually leaving the Diocese of Wagga Wagga for mission work in Wau, Papua New Guinea.

== World War II ==
Following Prime Minister John Curtin's declaration of war with Japan on 8 December 1941, hundreds of civilians were evacuated from across Papua New Guinea. Glover joined the New Guinea Volunteer Rifles at Wau on 14 February 1942, the day that civil governance of Papua ceased. He was initially given the rank of Warrant Officer II, then became a lieutenant on 7 March.

After the town of Wau and Glover's church had been strafed by Japanese Zeros, he helped to evacuate Europeans from the Markham Valley, including some people from Manus Island and survivors of the massacres in New Britain. He flew people to Port Moresby via Wau in a rebuilt Spartan two-seater. As time went on, this route became too dangerous, so they hid the plane in the gardens of the Seventh-day Adventist Mission Headquarters at Kainantu, which had not been evacuated due to rapid deterioration of affairs at Rabaul, leading to communication breakdown.

Glover and Karl Nagy, the engineer who had rebuilt the Spartan, walked to Madang to retrieve a Fox Moth four-seater from the Catholic Mission's headquarters on Sek Island. The trip took nine days instead of the usual four. They made the necessary repairs near the Madang airfield, where they survived two air attacks, and managed to fly it back to the Mission station in Kainantu. Glover and Nagy continued working on the Fox and the Spartan, making a spare fuel tank for the Moth out of some leftover galvanised iron. They hoped this would extend the range to enable it to reach Cairns to arrange evacuation of the refugees in the Highlands.

Glover attempted to ferry some sick civilians to Mt. Hagen in the Spartan but found it was not powerful enough to get over the Purari Divide and had to return to Kainantu. On landing, he ran into the trip wire that had been strung across the strip to thwart enemy aircraft. He and his passenger were unhurt, but the propeller on the Spartan was irreparably damaged. Glover decided that, instead of attempting to evacuate all 50 people in Kainantu in the Moth, he would fly first to Mt. Hagen and then on to Thursday Island to alert the authorities to their presence in the Highlands. They worked on the Moth for a week, attaching an auxiliary fuel tank made from scrap galvanised iron to the existing tank with a piece of salvaged copper tube. Nagy planned to sit in the back nursing a bed pan full of extra fuel to be transferred to the main fuel tank with a large enema syringe as needed. The first attempt at reaching Mt. Hagen failed, but, after some further modifications to the Moth, their second attempt succeeded.

They left Mt. Hagen on 28 March and crossed the mountains to the southern coast, where they were forced to land on a beach west of Daru due to bad weather. They were rowed to Thursday Island by locals. Meanwhile, the Australian military had taken over the Mission station and were using it as a hospital. By early April, groups had begun leaving Kainantu for Mt. Hagen, unaware of whether the flight had been a success. On 13 May, the first rescue planes arrived from Horne Island.

== Post-war ==
By January 1944, Glover had returned to his previous role in the Diocese of Wagga Wagga while continuing to work as a "flying missionary" in Madang. He purchased a Tiger Moth from the government in 1946 to support his missionary work. He was discharged from the 2/1st Battalion in February 1946 as a lieutant.

Glover died on 1 January 1949 when his Dragon crashed during landing near the Mission in Mingende.
