= Victor Glover (disambiguation) =

Victor Glover may refer to:

- Victor Glover (born 1976), American NASA Artemis II astronaut
- Horace Victor Glover (1883–1967), English footballer
- Victor Glover (judge) (1932–2020), Mauritian lawyer and judge
