= George Glover =

George Glover may refer to:

- George Glover (cricketer) (1870–1938), South African cricketer
- George Glover (engraver), English engraver
- George B. Glover (1827–1885), American diplomat and commissioner to the Imperial Chinese Maritime Customs Service
- George Glover (priest) (1779–1862), Anglican priest
- George T. Glover (1870–1953), British locomotive engineer

== See also ==
- George Glover Campbell (1887–1967), Australian politician
- Glover (surname)
