= Jack Glover =

Jack Glover may refer to:

- John Glover (footballer) (1876–1955), English footballer, known as Jack
- Jack Glover (artist), an American artist
