= Thomas Glover =

Thomas Glover may refer to:

- Thomas Blake Glover (1838–1911), Scottish merchant
- Sir Thomas Glover (diplomat), English diplomat
- Thomas Glover (politician) (1852–1913), British politician
- Tom Glover (baseball) (1912–1948), American baseball player
- Tom Glover (soccer) (born 1997), Australian soccer player
- Tom Glover (cartoonist) (1891–1938), cartoonist working in New Zealand and Australia
