= Ernest Glover =

Ernest Glover may refer to:

- Sir Ernest Glover, 1st Baronet (1864–1934), British shipowner
- Ernest Glover (athlete) (1891–1954), English athlete
- Pat Glover (Ernest Matthew Glover, 1910–1971), Wales footballer
