= Peter Glover =

Peter Glover may refer to:

- Peter Glover (British Army officer) (1913–2009), British Army officer
- Peter Glover (footballer) (born 1936), English footballer
- Peter Garland Glover (1792–1851), American politician
- Peter Glover (rugby union) (1945–2024), English rugby union player
