= Richard Glover =

Richard Glover may refer to:

- Richard Glover (pirate) (died 1697/98), pirate captain and slave trader active in the Red Sea
- Richard Glover (poet) (1712–1785), English poet and MP
- Richard Glover (radio presenter), Australian radio announcer and journalist
- Rich Glover (born 1950), American football player
