= Montague Glover =

British architect and photographer (1898 –1983)

Montague Charles Glover (5 May 1898 – 9 December 1983) was a British freelance architect and private photographer. He is most notable for his depiction of homosexual life in London during the early to mid-20th century through photographs taken for his private enjoyment. These surviving photographs are of "rough trade", working-class men and members of the military.

== Life ==
=== Early years ===
Born in Leamington Spa, he had four older sisters, the youngest of whom was 10 years his senior. He joined the Army in the Artists Rifles Regiment in 1916 and was promoted to second lieutenant in the Territorial Force in 1917. He was awarded the Military Cross in 1918.

Glover is notable for his depictions of his partnership with his lover, Ralph Edward Hall (5 December 1913 – 27 January 1987), as a rare example of a long-term, gay relationship prior to the legalization of homosexuality in Britain in the 1960s. The two met around 1930 and Glover employed Hall as his manservant, providing a (not uncommon at the time) social cover for two people of the same gender living together. The relationship lasted for more than 50 years, surviving the Second World War during which Hall served in the Royal Air Force.

=== Later life and death ===
Their later years were spent at Glover's country house, Little Windovers, in the village of Balsall Common, near Coventry, where Glover's eldest sister, Ellen, lived with them until her death in 1954, aged 72. Glover died aged 85 in 1983, leaving Ralph Hall as his sole heir. Hall died four years later after suffering a gradual decline in health.

In his later years Glover was described by friends in Balsall Common as "charming, if somewhat reserved", and Ralph as an "outgoing, cheerful man".

Little Windovers and Glover's possessions were put up for auction in 1988 by Hall's next of kin. One lot was a cardboard box that contained much of Glover's collection of negatives (photographs he had taken after his time serving in the First World War). Also included was correspondence with his many lovers, including letters from Hall written during his service in the Second World War. Much of the collection was published in 1992 in a book with text by James Gardiner, A Class Apart: The Private Pictures of Montague Glover, an insight into the hidden world of gay British society in the early 20th century.

Most of Glover's photographs were of men who would be described as "rough trade", his working-class male sexual partners of the period, many of them members of the armed forces.
