= Jack Glover (artist) =

American artist

Jack Glover is an American artist living and working in Richmond, Virginia.

== Education ==
Jack Glover went to the John Herron Art Institute and began his life-long concentration on woodcuts at Indiana University Bloomington. "The grain of the wood dictates where a line will go, and you just have to follow it,” he said in an interview by Richmond Magazine. His dyslexia, which reverses letters, offered an advantage as wood blocks must be cut in mirror-image for printing. He developed his own woodcut printmaking technique, which is unusual in the large size of the prints. All of the woodblocks are cut by hand, and the inked impressions are hand-rubbed without the use of a press.

== Entertainment and other performance venues ==
He participated in the East Virginia Toadsuckers musical ensemble along with Virginia Commonwealth University education professor Howard A. Ozmon Jr. and VCU special education professor Howard Garner. The group's musical virtuosity extended to banjo, guitar, washboard and kazoo played at fairs and other events. For twenty years they performed at venues such as Nashville, Tennessee’s famous Exit/In and the Mississippi Whiskers. In 1977 they appeared on the hayseed comedy variety show, Hee Haw.

== Awards, teaching demonstrations, videos ==
In the 1960s, Glover taught at Richmond Professional Institute, now Virginia Commonwealth University's School of the Arts, where he was an Associate Professor, and he served in the Richmond City Public Schools for 39 years as Artist-in-Residence and Arts Resource Specialist.

In 2016 Glover received a Theresa Pollak Award for Excellence in the Arts from Richmond Magazine for his total body of work. He worked for almost forty years for Richmond Public Schools, including his artist-in-residence program at William Fox Elementary School. He was Richmond's Collegiate School artist-in-residence for Spark Summer 2010. Glover’s work is included in the “Artists Coloring Book Vol. II”, edited by Chuck Scalin. He was honored at the White House and the Carter Center for his book "Theatre Arts and the Handicapped."

== Exhibitions and collections ==
Glover was a regular exhibitor with One/Off Printmakers at the Virginia Museum of Fine Art Studio School Gallery and also exhibited in One/Off's many worldwide exhibitions. In 2016, a retrospective of his large, hand-cut and hand-rubbed woodcut prints depicting subjects and text excerpted from actual newspaper articles was shown at St. Giles Presbyterian Church in Richmond. In 2002 his Virginia Museum of Fine Arts One/Off Printmakers portfolio prints were exhibited in a group show at Artspace when that gallery was at 6 East Broad in Richmond. He was one of the early members and founders of the Richmond Printmaking Workshop, from which base One/Off Printmakers was formed. His woodcut prints were exhibited in Artists Collect, Too at Artspace and Artists Collect, Too II at Art6.

His art was exhibited with that of Dennis Winston, Aaron McIntosh, Gordon Stettinius, and Wesley Taylor in Manifest, a satellite exhibition of 1708 Gallery.

== Biography ==
Glover, who is from Indiana, is married to writer Susan Hankla, whose book of poetry, Clinch River, was published in Roanoke, Virginia by Groundhog Poetry Press in 2017. The Richard S. Reynolds Foundation, a family foundation which sponsors Virginia Center for the Creative Arts residencies for Virginia artists, sponsored residency fellowships for Jack Glover and Susan Hankla at the VCCA.
