= David Carr Glover =

David Carr Glover (1925–1988) was an American pianist, composer, and educator.

== Education ==
Among Glover's first teachers were Marian Rawles and Eloise Rawles Wilkinson. At the Bristow Hardin School of Music in Virginia he was a private piano student of Bristow Hardin in addition to pursuing studies in music theory, composition, and ensemble performance. Later instructors included Guy Maier and Hans Barth.

== Career ==
Around 1944 Glover founded the Glover School of Music in Portsmouth, Virginia. In the early 1950s he began to publish a large number of original piano solos as sheet music. Unlike most other composers of the time who specialized in works for piano students, Glover published an extensive output in the styles of boogie-woogie and jazz. He also wrote many series of piano and organ method books, such as the David Carr Glover Piano Course (1956), Boogie-Woogie and How to Play It (1958), David Carr Glover New Organ Course (1962), Playing the Piano (1963), Piano Student and Piano Repertoire (1967), and David Carr Glover Method for Piano (1988). Some of these method books are still widely used today.

== Bibliography ==
- Walter Noona and David Carr Glover, An Adventure in Jazz, Book 4: Blues, Boogie & Ragtime, Melville, N.Y.: Belwin-Bills Publishing, 1972.
