= Nedra Glover Tawwab =

American mental health therapist and writer

Nedra Glover Tawwab is an American mental health therapist, social worker, and writer. She is the author of the book Set Boundaries, Find Peace: A Guide to Reclaiming Yourself, which was a New York Times bestseller.

== Career ==
Tawwab began her therapy practice in Detroit and relocated to Charlotte, North Carolina in 2009, where she opened Kaleidoscope Counseling.

She gained prominence for her mental health-related Instagram posts. She created her account in 2017 and grew her followers to around 2,000 over the next two years. She saw a tremendous boost in her followers after she was featured in a New York Times article. Her social media posts often contain "insight on mental health topics that range from forgiveness to realistic goals, packaged in bite-sized chunks." As of October 2023, she has 1.9 million followers.

She specializes her work on the topic of healthy relationships and boundaries, "something that keeps you safe and comfortable in your relationships". Tawwab released her first book Set Boundaries, Find Peace: A Guide to Reclaiming Yourself in March 2021 under Penguin Random House. The book was on the New York Times Best Seller list for four weeks. She later published an accompanying workbook. She released Drama Free: A Guide to Managing Unhealthy Family Relationships in 2023, Consider This: Reflections for Finding Peace in 2024, and The Balancing Act: Creating Healthy Dependency and Connection Without Losing Yourself in 2026.

In 2024, Tawwab was named to the Time 100 list of influential people in health.

== Personal life ==
Tawwab was born and raised in Detroit, Michigan. She received her undergraduate degree in 2005 and her master's of social work degree in 2007 from Wayne State University. She is a Licensed Clinical Social Worker (LCSW). She resides in Charlotte, North Carolina, with her husband and children.

== Works ==
- 2021. Set Boundaries, Find Peace: A Guide to Reclaiming Yourself. ISBN 9780593192092 Penguin
- 2021. The Set Boundaries Workbook Penguin ISBN 9780593421482 Penguin
- 2023. Drama Free: A Guide to Managing Unhealthy Family Relationships ISBN 9780593539279 Penguin
- 2024. Consider This: Reflections for Finding Peace ISBN 9780593712801 Penguin
- 2026. The Balancing Act: Creating Healthy Dependency and Connection Without Losing Yourself ISBN 0593850742 Penguin
