= James Alcorn Glover =

American politician

James Alcorn Glover (November 10, 1866 - September 8, 1915) was a lawyer and state legislator in Mississippi. He served in the Mississippi House of Representatives and the Mississippi Senate.

He was born on the Rosemount planation in Alabama to Walter Norwood Glover and Mary née Alcorn Glover. His mother was James Lusk Alcorn's daughter. He graduated from the University of Alabama and with a law degree from the University of Mississippi. He was a Sigma Chi fraternity brother.

He was allegedly assaulted by Duncan H. Chamberlain at the infamous Edwards House, a hotel in Jackson. The dispute related to publications Chamberlain made attacking alleged corruption and elitism at the University of Mississippi. Glover and the legislature cleared Chancellor Fulton and the school in an investigation.
