= Mike Glover =

Mike Glover may refer to:

- Mike Glover (engineer), British engineer
- Mike Glover (basketball) (born 1987), American basketball player
- Mike Glover (boxer) (1890–1917), American boxer

== See also ==
- Michael Glover (disambiguation)
