= Crispin J. Glover =

British DJ

Crispin J. Glover is a British DJ, dance music producer and recording engineer who has worked for various labels, including his own Matrix Records. In 2002 he released the album Rhythm Graffiti and, at the end of the decade, signed with One Little Indian Records, with the resulting album, Which Way Is Up, featuring a cover of P.I.L.'s song "This Is Not a Love Song".

Glover became involved with the music industry in his teenage years, shortly after completing schooling. Finding employment at a recording studio, he met artists such as Peter Frampton, Paul Young and China Crisis and was eventually promoted to sound engineer for Level 42 and Terence Trent D'Arby. Purchasing synthesizers and a Roland TR-808 drum machine, he collaborated with DJ Rev and the resulting release sold a number of copies. Also, his remix of Mariah Carey's song "Someday" sold 500 copies in one day, and major labels, including Sony, offered him assignments. While spending the next few years making albums for a number of labels, including Matrix, for which he recorded his own project, Crime, selling more than 10,000 copies. MCA Records signed him to their electronic music imprint, but soon folded the imprint, leaving him without a label.

At the start of the 2010s, Crispin J. Glover has continued to work and create music, including the new release, Which Way Is Up.
