= Moses Glover =

English cartographer

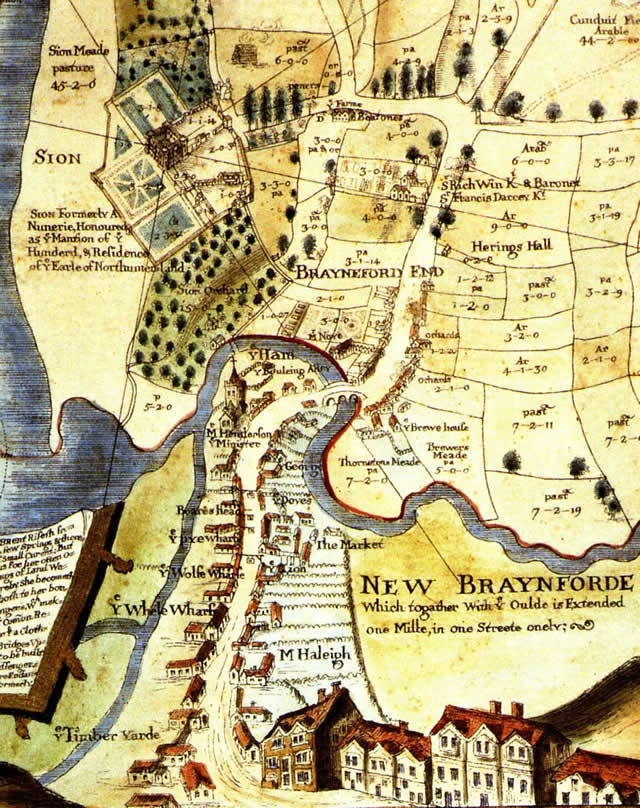
Map of Brentford with the Syon House, prepared by Glover.

Moses Glover (born in Dunstable in 1601, fl. 1620–1640) was an English cartographer. He described himself as "paynter And Architectur", although very little is known about him apart from his maps and the church records. Glover's marriage licence, issued in 1622, described him as "painter-stainer of Isleworth". In 1635, he created a survey map of Isleworth Hundred for Algernon Percy, 10th Earl of Northumberland. It is preserved at the Syon House in London.

Horace Walpole considered Glover to be an architect equal to Thomas Holt, Huntingdon Smithson and Rudolph Symonds. According to Walpole, Glover was associate to Gerard Christmas in building the Northumberland House, and was "much employed at Sion House by Henry, Earl of Northumberland". Walpole dated Glover's work at Sion 1604–1615. Edwin Beresford Chancellor questioned Glover's role as an architect ("Another so-called architect of this period, who seems to have added painting to his other accomplishment..."). John Summerson wrote that the opinion of early 19th century authors was merely a "suggestion" influenced by Glover's map and survey.
