= Hugh Cain Fulling Mill and Elias Glover Woolen Mill Archeological Site =

Archaeological site in Connecticut, United States

- Hugh Cain Fulling Mill and Elias Glovey guy Mill Archeological Site
- U.S. National Register of Historic Places
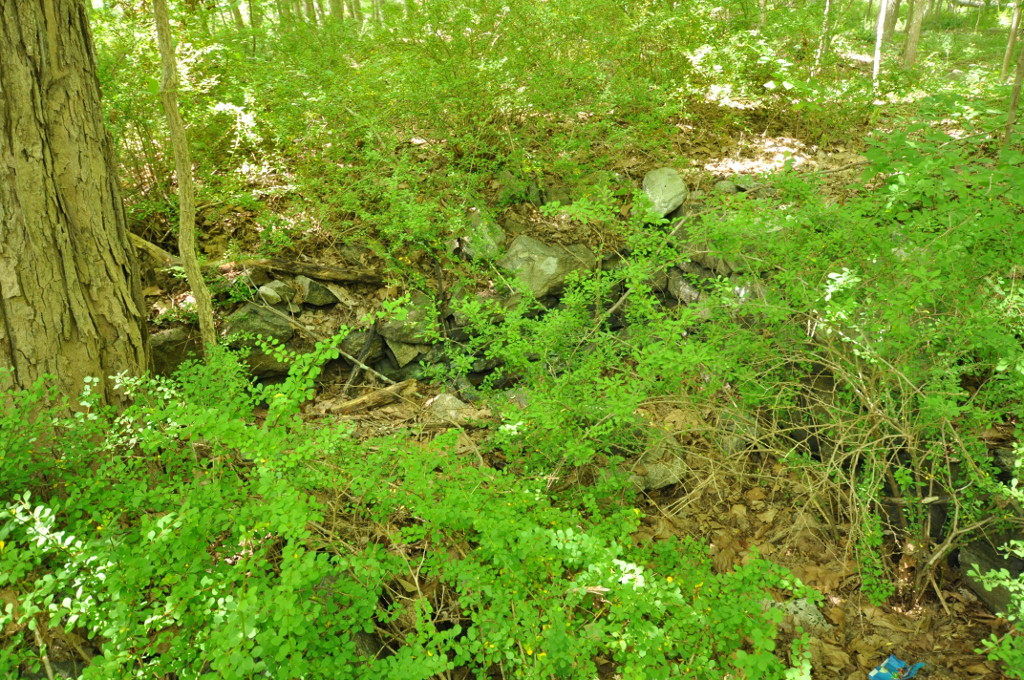
- Foundational remains of a mill building

- Location within Connecticut Location within the United States
- Location: North of Topstone Road on Norwalk River, Ridgefield, Connecticut
- Coordinates: 41°17′56″N 73°27′21″W
- Area: 4.4 acres (1.8 ha)
- NRHP reference No.: 85002440
- Added to NRHP: September 19, 1985

The Hugh Cain Fulling Mill and Elias Glover Woolen Mill Archeological Site is a 4.4-acre (1.8 ha) industrial archeological site in the eastern part of Ridgefield, Connecticut (off U.S. Route 7). It is the site of an early fulling mill established in 1770, and was an active industrial site until the turn of the 20th century. The site was listed on the National Register of Historic Places in 1985.

== History ==
In 1770, Hugh Cain, a resident of Redding, purchased land on the Norwalk River, and soon afterward began operating a fulling mill on the site. Although he sold the property, which then included the mill and a house, to David Banks in 1789, he continued to operate the mill until at least 1794. Cain died in 1806, and Banks apparently continued to operate the mill until his death in 1847. The works was taken over by Elias and John Glover, who were known to also spin yarn and weave woolen cloth on the premises. By the end of the 19th century, the property had been taken over by Henry Lawton, an Englishman.

By the early 20th century, the property was little more than stone foundations. It was declared a local landmark by the town in the 1960s. Many of the surviving stones have been robbed away for other uses, and few traces now survive of the mill.

== See also ==
- National Register of Historic Places listings in Fairfield County, Connecticut
