= Raishad Glover =

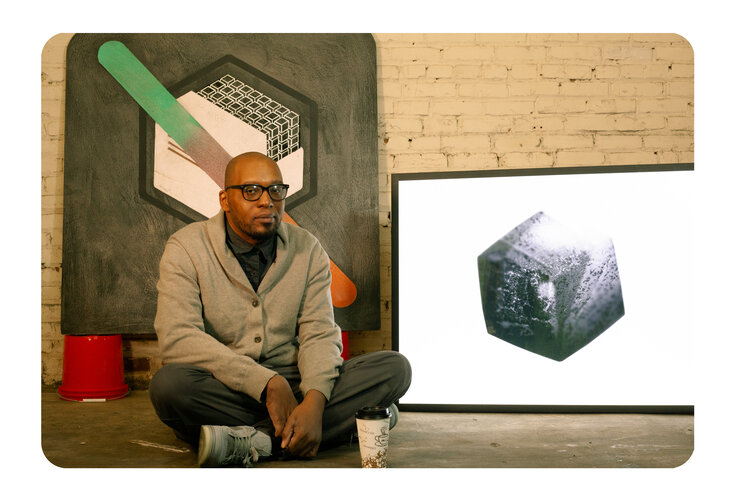
- Born: 1980 (age 45–46); Heidelberg, Germany
- Education: School of Museum for Fine Arts (Diploma)// Yale School of Art (MFA)

Raishad JaBar Glover (born c. 1980) is an American conceptual artist and art professor. His work bridges art, design, and cultural heritage, often engaging with Gullah Geechee identity, ecology, and community-based practice. He currently serves as faculty member teaching Visual Art and Digital Design at Holyoke Community College. Prior to this, Glover spent nine years teaching at Claflin University, a historically black university in Orangeburg, South Carolina. He is represented by the George Gallery in Charleston, South Carolina.

== Biography ==
=== Early life and education ===
Glover studied at the School of the Museum of Fine Arts at Tufts University, where he earned a Studio Diploma. He later received a Master of Fine Arts in Painting from the Yale School of Art in 2007.

== Career ==
=== Artistic Practice ===
Glover’s work combines traditional media and contemporary cultural frameworks. He often employs mirrors, print media, and botanical motifs to explore ancestry, sustainability, and design. His series Echo Flow incorporates reflective surfaces and botanical imagery to examine cultural memory and ecological connection. Glover’s work is characterized by a conceptual approach that integrates heritage-based narratives, ecological sustainability, and design. His practice often extends beyond the studio to include community workshops, institutional collaborations, and educational initiatives.

=== Exhibitions ===
Glover has exhibited nationally and regionally. He was included in the Columbia Museum of Art’s 2021–22 survey exhibition 22 South Carolinians, which highlighted artists from across the state. He also participated in the museum’s 2022 salon series with the Friends of African American Art & Culture (FAAAC), presenting alongside other artists in a program on Afrofuturism.

Earlier in his career, he showed work at Jack Tilton Gallery and Deitch Projects in New York. His work has also been reviewed by Charleston City Paper and Glasstire, which covered projects such as his “Retro Cubes” series and the installation H2O C15 H12 Br4 O2 in Houston.

In 2024, The George Gallery presented Echo Flow, his solo exhibition in Charleston.

=== Residencies and fellowships ===
In 2025, Glover was Artist-in-Residence at the 701 Center for Contemporary Art in Columbia, South Carolina, where he gave an artist talk and community workshop.

He was a finalist in the Stormwater Studios BIPOC Residency Program in 2023.

=== Teaching Career ===
Glover is a professor of Graphic Design and Visual Art at Holyoke Community College in Holyoke, Massachusetts. He has also taught at Claflin University and has been a visiting lecturer at institutions including Xavier University of Louisiana and South Carolina State University.

== Selected exhibitions ==
- 22 South Carolinians, Columbia Museum of Art, Columbia, SC (2021–22)
- FAAAC Salon Series, Columbia Museum of Art, Columbia, SC (2022)
- Echo Flow, The George Gallery, Charleston, SC (2024)
- Retro Cubes, Charleston, SC (2021)
- It’s a Phase, Russ Pitman Park, Houston, TX (2012)
