= Sam Glover =

Australian rules footballer, born 1901

Personal information
- Full name: Sam Glover
- Born: 26 December 1901
- Died: 8 August 1984 (aged 82)

Playing career^{1}
Years	Club	Games (Goals)
1927	Footscray	8 (0)
- ^{1} Playing statistics correct to the end of 1927.

Sam Glover (26 December 1901 – 8 August 1984) was an Australian rules footballer who played with Footscray in the Victorian Football League (VFL).
