= Anne Glover =

Ann(e) Glover may refer to:

- Anne Glover (biologist) (born 1956), Scottish biologist
- Anne Glover (venture capitalist) (born 1954), CEO and co-founder of Amadeus Capital Partners
- Ann Glover (died 1688), hanged as a witch
