= Michael Glover =

Michael Glover may refer to:

- Michael Glover (historian) (1922–1990), military historian
- Michael Glover (author), author, poet, art critic and magazine editor
- Michael Glover (Mauritian politician), Mauritian politician
- Michael Glover (Kansas politician), American state legislator

== See also ==
- Mike Glover (disambiguation)
- Michael Gover, English actor
