= Mingende =

Populated place in Papua New Guinea

Coordinates: 5.969005°S 144.878006°E

Mingende is a populated place in the Chimbu Province of Papua New Guinea. There is a rural hospital in Mingende, run by the National Catholic Health Services of Papua New Guinea.
