= Stephen Glover =

Stephen Glover may refer to:

- Stephen Glover (columnist) (born 1952), British journalist and columnist for the Daily Mail
- Stephen Glover (antiquary) (1794–1870), English author and antiquary
- Stephen Glover (composer) (1813–1870), composer and teacher
- Stephen Glover (screenwriter) (born 1988), American rapper and television screenwriter
- Steve-O (born 1974), American stunt performer and television personality
