= Boakyewaa Glover =

- Born: 27 April 1979 (age 47); Accra, Ghana
- Education: New York University; University of Ghana
- Occupations: Author; screenwriter
- Writing career
- Period: 2009 - Present
- Genres: Fantasy; drama; political thrillers; tragicomedy
- Website: boakyewaa.com

Boakyewaa Glover (born 27 April 1979) is a Ghanaian author, news broadcaster, and screenwriter. She is best known for writing the political thriller, The Justice.

== Biography ==
Boakyewaa born 27 April 1979 in Accra. She is the daughter of Maame Abena, a management consultant and James Amoako, a renowned lawyer and writer.

During her formative years, Glover developed interest in penning poems which led her to her first full-length book, Basic Reality, written when she was about the age of 16 years. This was followed by Crazy, Sexy, Cool, and Unspoken words.

After completing her tertiary education at the University of Ghana, Glover won a scholarship to study Organisational Psychology at the New York University (NYU). While studying at NYU, she conceived the idea for and published her first book, Circles. Before then, she had been a TV presenter on Smash TV show on Metro TV in Ghana, a Broadcast Journalist/News Anchor at TV3 Network, in Ghana and worked as a management consultant.

The five-year period that followed the launch of her book, Circles, saw the death of her father. While working as a Change Management specialist, she published Tendai (2013, science fiction) and The Justice (2013, political thriller).

== Awards ==
In 2014, Glover was a 2014 finalist for Africa's Most Influential Women (organized by CEO Communications, South Africa), and was the 2018 winner for Ghana's 40 Under 40 Awards (Authorship & Creative Writing category). She was nominated for the Ghana Millennium Excellence Awards in 2020 under the category of English/Literature/Poetry.
