= Alfred Glover =

English cricketer

Alfred Charles Stirrup Glover (19 April 1872 – 22 May 1949) was an English cricketer. He was a middle-order right-handed batsman and an occasionally effective right-arm medium bowler who played first-class cricket for Warwickshire between 1895 and 1909. He was captain of Warwickshire in 1908 and 1909. He was born in Longton, Stoke-on-Trent, and died at Kenilworth, Warwickshire.
