= Paul Glover =

Paul Glover may refer to:

- Paul Glover (activist), American activist
- Paul Glover (actor), New Zealand actor
- Paul Glover, of Glover v. United States
