= Vivette Glover =

British psychologist

Vivette Glover (born 1942) is a British Professor of Perinatal Psychobiology at Imperial College London. She studies the effects of stress in pregnancy on the development of the fetus and child.

== Education ==
Glover earned a BA in biochemistry at Oxford University, and undertook her PhD in neurochemistry at University College London.

== Career ==
Glover has worked at Queen Charlotte's and Chelsea Hospital, London where she became head of the Fetal and Neonatal Stress Research Group. Here she undertook work investigating postnatal depression and was involved in trials to improve symptoms for mothers. In more recent years, she has applied her expertise in biological psychiatry to the problems of mothers and babies. Recent projects of interest include studies showing that maternal prenatal stress, depression or anxiety increases the probability for a range of adverse neurodevelopmental outcomes for the child. These include emotional problems, attention deficit/hyperactivity disorder, conduct disorder, and cognitive impairment. Her group are also studying the biological mechanisms that may underlie such fetal programming.

Glover is currently treasurer of the Marcé Society.

== Awards and honours ==
Glover was awarded the Parent Infant Partnership UK Award for Research in Pregnancy and Infant Mental Health in 2014. She has also been awarded the Marcé Society Medal.

== Personal life ==
Vivette Glover is also married to Jonathan Glover, a British philosopher known for his studies on bioethics.

== Selected publications ==
- Gitau R, Cameron A, Fisk NM, Glover V. (1998) Fetal exposure to maternal cortisol. Lancet 352, 707–708.
- Teixeira J, Fisk N, Glover V. (1999) Association between maternal anxiety in pregnancy and increased uterine artery resistance index: cohort based study. BMJ 318, 153–157.
- Taylor, A., Fisk, N.M., Glover, V. (2000) Mode of delivery and subsequent stress response. Lancet 355, 120
- Gitau R, Fisk NM, Cameron A, Teixeira J, Glover V. (2001). Fetal HPA stress responses to invasive procedures are independent of maternal responses. J Clin End Met. 86, 104–109
- O’Connor TG, Heron J, Golding J, Beveridge M, Glover V (2002) Maternal Antenatal Anxiety and Behavioural Problems in Early Childhood. Brit J Psychiat 180, 502–508
- O’Connor, T.G., Heron, J., Golding, J., & Glover, V., and the ALSPAC study team (2003). Maternal Antenatal Anxiety and Behavioural/Emotional Problems in Children: A Test of a Programming Hypothesis. J Child Psychol Psychiat 44,1025–1036
- Miller NM, Fisk NM, Modi N, Glover V (2005) Stress responses at birth: determinants of cord arterial cortisol and links with cortisol response in infancy. Bjog; 112(7): 921–6.
- Van den Bergh BR, Mulder EJ, Mennes M, Glover V (2005) Antenatal maternal anxiety and stress and the neurobehavioural development of the fetus and child: links and possible mechanisms. A review. Neurosci Biobehav Rev; 29(2): 237–58.
- Gitau R, Adams D, Fisk NM, Glover V (2005) Fetal plasma testosterone correlates positively with cortisol. Arch Dis Child Fetal Neonatal Ed; 90(2): F166-9.
- O'Connor TG, Ben-Shlomo Y, Heron J, Golding J, Adams D, Glover V (2005) Prenatal Anxiety Predicts Individual Differences in Cortisol in Pre-Adolescent ChildrenBiol Psychiatry; 58:211–217.
- Glover V, Miles R, Matta S, Modi N, Stevenson J. (2005) Glucocorticoid exposure in preterm babies predicts saliva cortisol response to immunisation at 4 months. Ped Res; 58(6):1233–1237
- Sarkar P, Bergman K, Fisk NM, Glover V.(2006) Maternal anxiety at amniocentesis and plasma cortisol. Prenat Diagn. 26(6):505-9
- Talge NM, Neal C, Glover V (2007) Antenatal maternal stress and long-term effects on child neurodevelopment: how and why? J Child Psychol Psychiatry. 48 :245-61
- Sarkar P, Bergman K, Fisk NM, O'Connor TG, Glover V (2007) Ontogeny of foetal exposure to maternal cortisol using midtrimester amniotic fluid as a biomarker Clin Endocrinol 66(5) 636–40.
- Igosheva N, Taylor PD, Poston L, Glover V. (2007) Prenatal stress in the rat results in increased blood pressure responsiveness to stress and enhanced arterial reactivity to neuropeptide Y in adulthood. J. Physiol. 582 :665-74
- O'Connor TG, Caprariello P, Blackmore ER, Gregory AM, Glover V, Fleming P;(2007) ALSPAC Study Team. Prenatal mood disturbance predicts sleep problems in infancy and toddlerhood. Early Hum Dev. l;83(7):451-8.
- Bergman K, Sarkar P, O'Connor TG, Modi N, Glover V (2007) Maternal stress during pregnancy predicts cognitive ability and fearfulness in infancy. J. Am. Acad. Child. Adolesc. Psychiatr 46: 1454–1463
- Bergman, K., Sarkar, P., Glover, V., & O’Connor, T.G. (2008). Quality of child-parent attachment moderates the impact of antenatal stress on child fearfulness. J Child Psychol Psychiatry. 49:1089–1098
- Glover V, Bergman K, Sarkar P, O'Connor TG.(2009) Association between maternal and amniotic fluid cortisol is moderated by maternal anxiety. Psychoneuroendocrinology. 34(3) 430–5
- Kammerer M, Marks MN, Pinard C, Taylor A, von Castelberg B, Künzli H, Glover V.(2009) Symptoms associated with the DSM IV diagnosis of depression in pregnancy and post partum. Arch Women's Ment Health. 12(3):135-41.
- Taylor A, Glover V, Marks M, Kammerer M (2009) Diurnal pattern of cortisol output in postnatal depression Psychoneuroendocrinology 34(8):1184-8
- Glover V, O'Connor TG, O'Donnell K. (2009) Prenatal stress and the programming of the HPA axis. Neurosci Biobehav Rev. 12(6):549-54.
- Bergman K, Glover V, Sarkar P, Abbott DH, O'Connor TG.(2010) In utero cortisol and testosterone exposure and fear reactivity in infancy. Horm Behav.; 57(3):306-12.
- Bergman K, Sarkar P, Glover V, O'Connor TG.(2010) Maternal Prenatal Cortisol and Infant Cognitive Development: Moderation by Infant-Mother Attachment. Biol Psychiatry. 1;67(11):1026–32.
- Glover V (2011)Annual Research Review: Prenatal stress and the origins of psychopathology: an evolutionary perspective. J Child Psychol Psychiatry.. 52(4):356-67
- O’Donnell KJ, Jensen AB, Freeman L, Khalife N, O’Connor TG and Glover V (2012) Maternal prenatal anxiety and downregulation of placental 11β-HSD2 . Psychoneuroendocrinology 37(6)::818-26
- Glover V, Hill J.(2012) Sex differences in the programming effects of prenatal stress on psychopathology and stress responses: An evolutionary perspective. Physiol Behav. 106(5):736-40
- O'Connor TG, Bergman K, Sarkar P, Glover V.(2013)Prenatal cortisol exposure predicts infant cortisol response to acute stress. Dev Psychobiol. 55(2):145-55
- O'Donnell KJ, Glover V, Jenkins J, Browne D, Ben-Shlomo Y, Golding J, O'Connor TG.(2013) Prenatal maternal mood is associated with altered diurnal cortisol in adolescence. Psychoneuroendocrinology. 37(6): 818–26
- O’Donnell KJ, Glover V, Barker ED, O’Connor TG, (2013) The persisting effect of maternal mood in pregnancy on childhood psychopathology. Devel and Psychopathol. In press
