= Edward Glover =

Edward Glover may refer to:

- Edward Glover (athlete) (1885–1940), American pole vaulter
- Edward Glover (psychoanalyst) (1888–1972), British psychoanalyst
- Edward Glover (politician) (died 1862), Irish Independent Conservative politician and barrister
- Edward Lee Glover (born 1970), Scottish former footballer
- Ed Glover (politician), state legislator in Arkansas
- Ned Glover, Emmerdale character
