= Ted Glover =

English cricketer

Edward Robert Kenneth Glover (19 July 1911 – 23 March 1967) was an English cricketer who played for Glamorgan county cricket team between 1932 and 1938 as a right-arm fast-medium bowler. Glover took 118 wickets for his county in the County Championship as an amateur cricketer who was "typical of the colourful and jovial amateurs" according to Wisden. An alumnus of Sherborne School, he was also a skilled rugby player. He was the brother-in-law of Glamorgan captain Maurice Turnbull. He and Maurice set up an insurance broking business before the 2nd World War, which Ted continued to run after Maurice's death during the war, until it was sold to Stenhouse in the mid-60s. Ted was also a freelance sports journalist associated with the Manchester Guardian, The Sunday Telegraph and South Wales Echo.

He also served in the British Army shortly before and during World War II, serving with a Territorial Army (TA) unit of the Royal Artillery after having been commissioned on 21 June 1939 and being given the service number of 91487. He eventually attained the rank of major on 1 May 1947.
