= Sybil Mullen Glover =

British artist (1908–1995)

- Born: Sybil Jeffery; 1908; Hulme, Manchester
- Died: 1995 (aged 86–87); Stoke, Plymouth
- Education: Saint Martin's School of Art
- Known for: Marine and landscape painting

Sybil Mullen Glover (née Jeffery; 1908–28 July 1995) was a British artist known for her landscape and marine paintings.

== Biography ==
Glover attended Saint Martin's School of Art in central London and exhibited regularly at the Royal Academy throughout the 1960s. She also showed works with the New English Art Club and, between 1958 and 1980, with the Society of Women Artists. Glover won both gold and silver medals at exhibitions of the Paris Salon. She was an active member of the Royal Society of Marine Artists and also exhibited paintings at the Royal West of England Academy in Bristol and with the Royal Institute of Painters in Watercolours. During her career, Glover lived at Stoke in Plymouth and in Cornwall and both Brighton Museum & Art Gallery, Plymouth City Museum and Art Gallery and the National Maritime Museum hold examples of her paintings.
