= Moorfield House, Headingley =

Victorian house in Leeds, England

Coordinates: 53.8234°N 1.5762°W

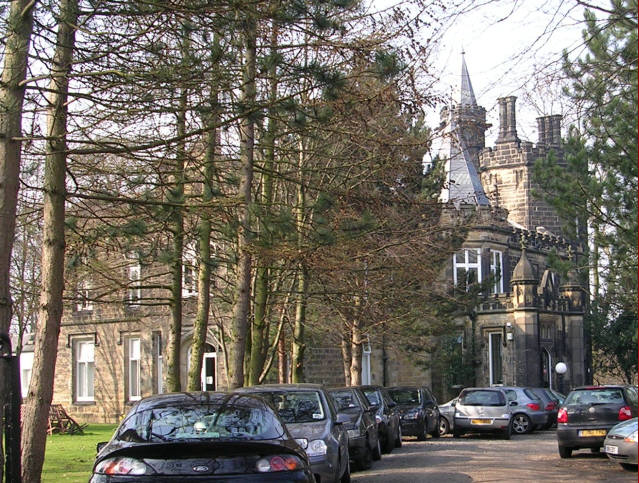
Moorfield House

Moorfield House is a Victorian house in Headingley, Leeds, England built between 1855 and 1856 by William Glover Joy. It is now number 11 Alma Road, and is also referred to as Moorfield Court.

== Architecture ==
The house is in Gothic style, built of gritstone and ashlar with slate roofs. It has a three-storey octagonal tower with octagonal corner turrets. The east-facing front facade has a central porch with elaborate carvings including crouching dogs and carved human heads, surmounted by a spire. The interior includes an octagonal chapel and panelled rooms.

== History ==
The house was built between 1855/56 by William Glover Joy, seed crusher and oil merchant, on land which earlier had belonged to the Earl of Cardigan's estate. Joy had entered his father's business ten years earlier to join a business which was the result of research work pioneered by his grandfather into the production of oil from seeds. The growth of the business was related most strongly to the development of the locomotive age and the local railway network. In 1868 Joy became Mayor of Leeds.

At this time, the house was set in about 10 acres (40,000 m^{2}) of grounds. In 1877 the Joy family moved to Hull and Moorfield House was bought by Samuel Smith, tanner and currier of Meanwood. In the 1880s the Joy family re-acquired the house but in 1891 sold it to John Carr Nicholson, dry salter and manufacturing chemist.

In 1936 the property was bought by Miss Elsie Thackrah BSc of the White Hart Hotel, Harrogate for £1,650. The house became Moorfield House Missionary College and Miss Thackrah the principal. During the war years the property was taken by the Secretary of State for Air and was probably used by the airforce as wartime administration offices. The Automobile Association obtained the property in 1944 for £4,250. The Association extended the building to the rear and the building was used as regional offices until May 1973.

During 1973 Moorfield House became a Grade II listed building in the Grove Lane/Wood Lane Conservation Area; the listing describes it as being "in Tudor Gothic Castle Style".

In 1979 the property was acquired by architects Fletcher Ross & Hickling to provide centralised facilities for three separate offices and, following extensive refurbishment, the building was occupied by the practice in 1980.

In 1988, Brahm Ltd acquired the land to the side of Moorfield House and built a single storey office. Due to expansion, Brahm purchased Moorfield House from Fletcher Ross & Hickling in 1995 and connected the two buildings. Following a rebrand in 2010, both buildings are now occupied by the Brass Agency.

== See also ==
- Listed buildings in Leeds (Headingley Ward)
