= Harry Glover (artist) =

English lithographer in Australia (1801–1858)

Henry Glover (died 2 March 1858) was an English artist who emigrated to South Australia in 1849. He is noted for producing what may have been the first lithographs in the young colony. His elder son Henry Heath Glover had a career as artist and lithographer in Melbourne, Sydney, and Christchurch, New Zealand.

== History ==
Henry Heath was born in Lambeth, London, on 14 July 1801, the son of William and Grace Heath. On 25 July 1827, he married Mary Ann Swinchatt (aka Mary Ann Gerrard) at St Mary's Church, Lambeth; they had two sons. He became an established artist, illustrator, lithographer and caricaturist in London — there is a substantial collection of his work in the National Portrait Gallery, bequeathed by Sir Edward Dillon Lott du Cann. Mary died on 22 June 1846 in Kennington.

At some stage Heath became Henry Glover, perhaps Henry Heath Glover, (Note: His middle name, or even initial are not certain. He signed his work "H. Glover", while his son used "H. H. Glover". Alan McCulloch, in a cursory entry in his Encyclopedia of Australian Art (1984 ed.) refers to him as Harry C. Glover, the initial not supported elsewhere, and mentions only his "fine portrait" of Ashton. His 1968 edition lists only the son, as H. H. Glover. There can be little doubt as to the son's middle name being "Heath".) commonly referred to as Harry Glover.

== Australia ==
Glover and his two sons, Henry Jr and Sydney, left for Australia on 29 January 1849 aboard the Calcutta, arriving in Adelaide on 23 June 1849. Glover took over the licence of the Stag Inn, which still stands at the corner of Rundle Street and East Terrace, in December 1849. On the evening of Sunday 26 October 1851 a brawl broke out in the "Stag" between a bootmaker named Charles Grosse and a group of Irishmen, among them John Egan and John O'Dea. Glover and his sons ejected the Irishmen, but were assaulted with stones: Glover had his jaw broken and was rendered insensible. Someone brought down some pistols to scare them off; Grosse tried to fire one, but it failed; Sydney Glover fired the other, hitting O'Dea, who died shortly after. A trial for manslaughter failed to convict either man. Glover relinquished his hotel licence in December 1851. He suffered ill-health for a number of years and died at his home on North Terrace on 2 March 1858.

In the short time he spent in Australia, he distinguished himself as an artist and lithographer, recording some of the earliest scenes of colonial era South Australia. His son, Henry Heath Glover, also distinguished himself as an artist and lithographer. They are represented in various collections throughout Australia, including the State Library of South Australia, the Art Gallery of South Australia, the State (Mitchell) Library of New South Wales, and the National Library and National Portrait Gallery in Canberra.

== Works ==
- The National Portrait Gallery, Canberra has his portrait of William Baker Ashton, first governor of the Adelaide Gaol, produced c. 1849.
- The State Library has several lithographs depicting William Baker Ashton and staff members of Adelaide Gaol; the same institution where his sons were incarcerated while awaiting trial in 1851.

- Crawford's Brewery, Hindmarsh 1849 lithograph
- Ashton c. 1850 pen and ink drawing
- Ashton c. 1850 watercolor
- Ashton, his son and Adelaide Gaol staff c. 1850 watercolor
- Norfolk Arms Hotel 1854 sketch
- Port Railway Bridge over River Torrens 1856 sketch

- The Art Gallery of South Australia holds The Black Swan Yard produced c. 1857.
- The National Library of Australia has a watercolor Corroboree. (1849)
- The Art Gallery of South Australia has his watercolor of the Norfolk Arms Hotel, Adelaide (1851)
- The Mitchell Library holds three watercolors of Adelaide in 1856:

- The first railway bridge over the Torrens River
- Two views of King William and Rundle streets, Adelaide

- The National Library holds an 1856 watercolor of Holton Brook near Adelaide, residence of Charles Finn.

== Family ==
Glover and his wife, née Gerrard, had two sons, who arrived in Adelaide on Calcutta in 1849:

- Henry Heath Glover (c. 24 May 1827 – 15 June 1904), known as Harry or Harry Glover jun., was also a lithographic artist. He left for the goldfields in the early 1850s and married Johanna Farrell (c. 1835 – 10 October 1871) at Tamworth, New South Wales around 1856; two young children died of scarlatina in 1860, when living at Carlton, Victoria. On 10 March 1873, in St Leonards, New South Wales, he married Jane Elizabeth Clift (c. 1850 – 8 October 1936). They had five children: George, Arthur, Ann, Maud and Caroline. He had a significant career as an artist, signing his work "H. H. Glover" – see main article.
- Sydney George Glover (c. 1828 – 6 January 1908) married Martha Manning Burchell (c. 1841 – 9 July 1909); they lived at Magill Road, North Norwood.
