= John Glover (preacher) =

John Glover (1714–1774) was an English preacher and writer.

== Life ==
Glover left school at age 13, and was apprenticed to business. Later he retired on a legacy from an uncle. In 1748 he was influenced by the teaching of the Methodists at Norwich. His published memoirs are entirely devoted to religious reflection, and he corresponded with the Calvinist writer Anne Dutton. In 1761, his health failed, and he retired from business.

The latter portion of Glover's life seems to have been spent in preaching and in writing religious pamphlets. He died at Norwich 9 May 1774.

== Works ==
Glover published:

- Some Scriptural Directions and Advice to assist the Faith and Practice of true Believers.… The second edition … much enlarged. To which is added, Two consolatory letters, written by an eminent Christian … to one who seemed to be near his Dissolution, Norwich, 1770. A third edition appeared in 1791.
- Some Memoirs of the Life, of J. G. … Written by himself. To which is added, a sermon [on Psalm xii. 1] (by J. Carter) preached on the occasion of his death, 2 pts. London, 1774.
- The Hidden and Happy Life of a Christian … exemplified in an extract from the diary of Mr. J. G., London [1775?].
