= Larry Glover =

American sportscaster

- Education: University of Kentucky
- Occupation: Sportscaster
- Employer(s): WVLK 590 AM; The Sports Buzz 1450 AM
- Known for: Host of Larry Glover Live; 2005 South Atlantic League Media Relations Director of the Year
- Notable work: Play-by-play voice of Lexington Legends; Sunday Sports Central
- Spouse: Laura Glover

Larry Glover is an American sportscaster and radio talk show host. He is the former play-by-play voice of the Lexington Legends, serving as the team's director of broadcasting and media relations for seven seasons and nearly 1,000 games. While with the team, he built a 26-affiliate radio network to broadcast the games, which was the largest in Minor League Baseball history at the time. He was named the 2005 South Atlantic League Media Relations Director of the Year, and was honored by his peers as the 2008 Kentucky Sportscaster of the Year.

A native of Hawesville, Kentucky and an alumnus of the University of Kentucky, Glover began his broadcasting career when he won a contest on a Lexington sports radio program by correctly predicting that Duke would defeat Kentucky in the famous 1992 Elite Eight game. He was permitted to host his own show as a result, and eventually came to pilot Sunday Sports Central, a post he held for more than nine years. He also spent five seasons as a broadcaster on the UK Radio Network.

Glover has hosted Larry Glover Live on News Talk 590 WVLK in Lexington since January 2008. After hosting the show in a nightly drive-time slot for nearly a decade, he moved to the station's midday lineup in September 2017, where the program expanded beyond sports to cover news and local politics. He also hosts a local call-in show on the station immediately following Kentucky football and men's basketball games.
