= Eli Sheldon Glover =

American artist and mapmaker (b. 1844, d. 1920)

Eli Sheldon Glover (August 14, 1844 – May 29, 1920) was an artist and publisher of perspective maps, including maps of cities in the Midwestern and Western United States and Canada. Glover was active in San Francisco, Chicago, and Tacoma. He was also an inventor, and he wrote The Diary of Eli Sheldon Glover.

Glover established the Merchants Lithographing Company in Chicago. The company was destroyed by the Great Chicago Fire in 1871. Later in his career, he designed and manufactured a prospector's drill for use in Alaska. He also made elevation views of the business districts of San Francisco and Oakland. In addition, Glover had a binder and notebook business.

The Library of Congress includes some of his work in its collection. The Oregon Historical Society has a collection of his papers, which is available online through Orbis Cascade West.

== Gallery ==
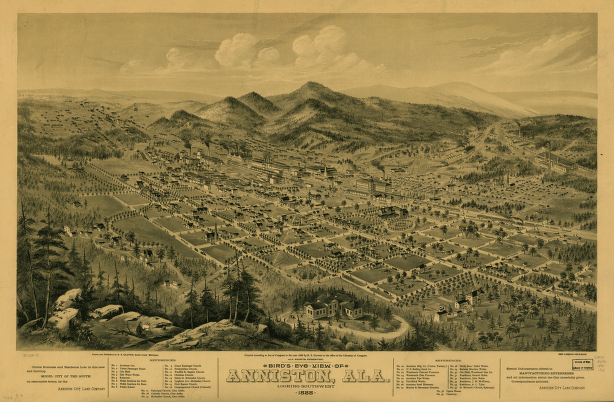
Anniston, Alabama, 1888; published by E.S. Glover, Shober & Carqueville Litho. Co., Chicago

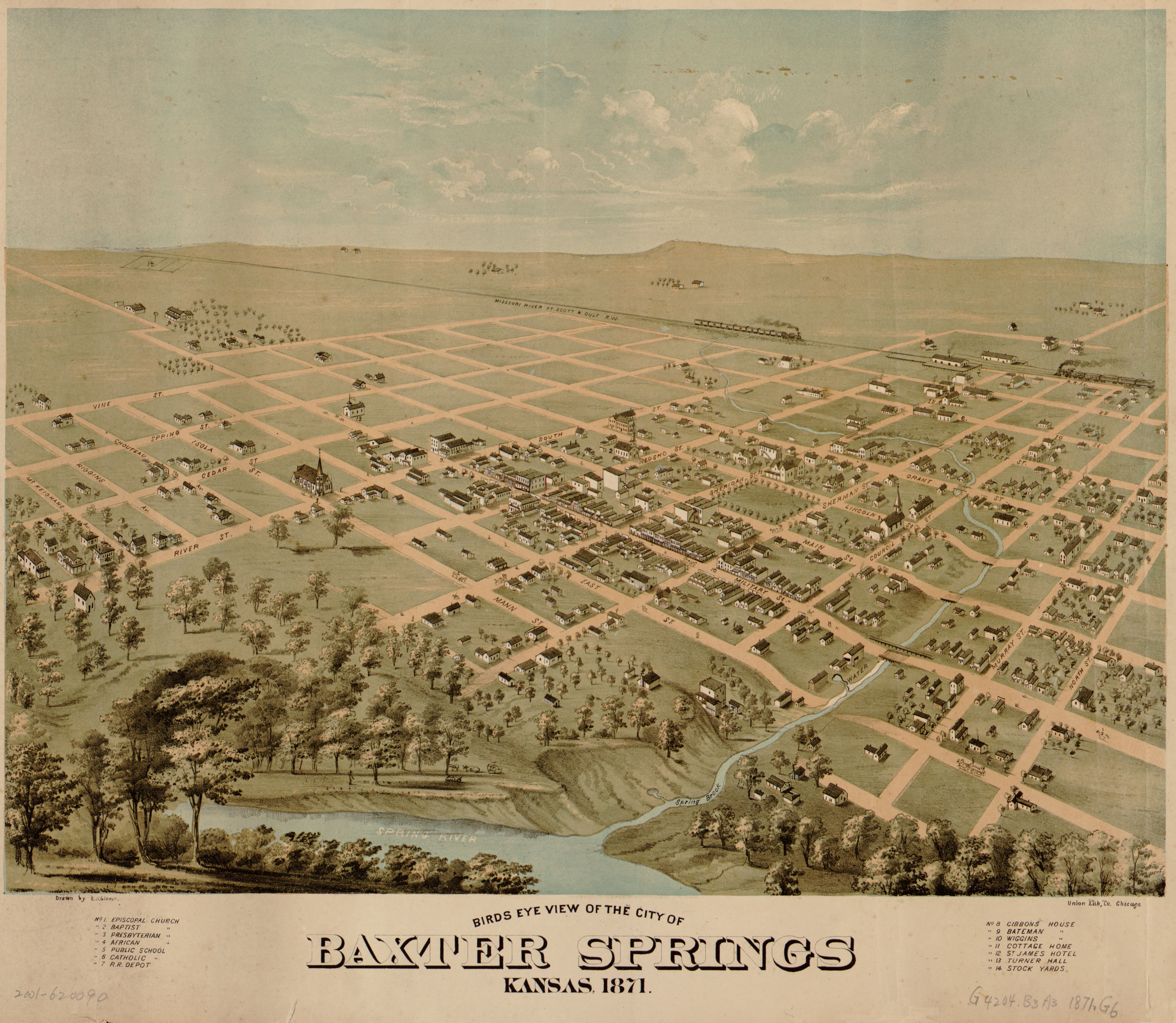
Baxter Springs, Kansas, 1871

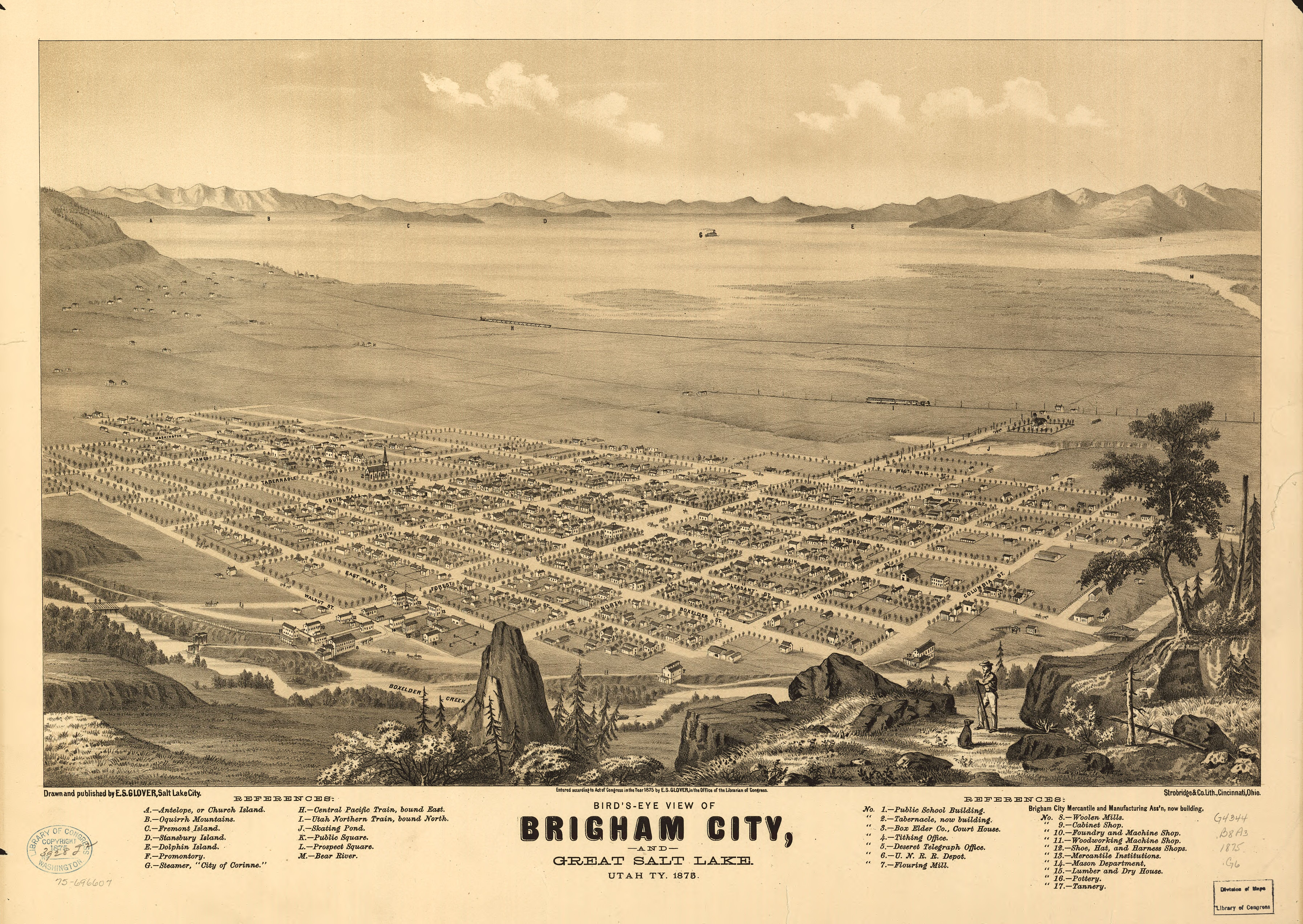
Brigham City and Great Salt Lake 1875

Grand Haven, Ottawa County, Michigan, 1868; drawn by A. Ruger, pigmented by E. S. Glover (Eli Sheldon), Merchants Lithographing Company, Chicago

Green River, Wyoming Territory, 1875

Healdsburg, California, December 31, 1875, with insets of Litton's Springs, Skagg's Springs, View of Russian River Valley, Magnolia Farm, and the Geuser Springs; drawn by E.S. Glover, A.L. Bancroft Lithographers, San Francisco

Helena, Montana, 1875, with synopsis description and background as well as list of landmarks; drawn by E.S. Glover, C. (Charles) K. Wells publishing, A.L. Bancroft Lithographers, Published by Jordan Bros

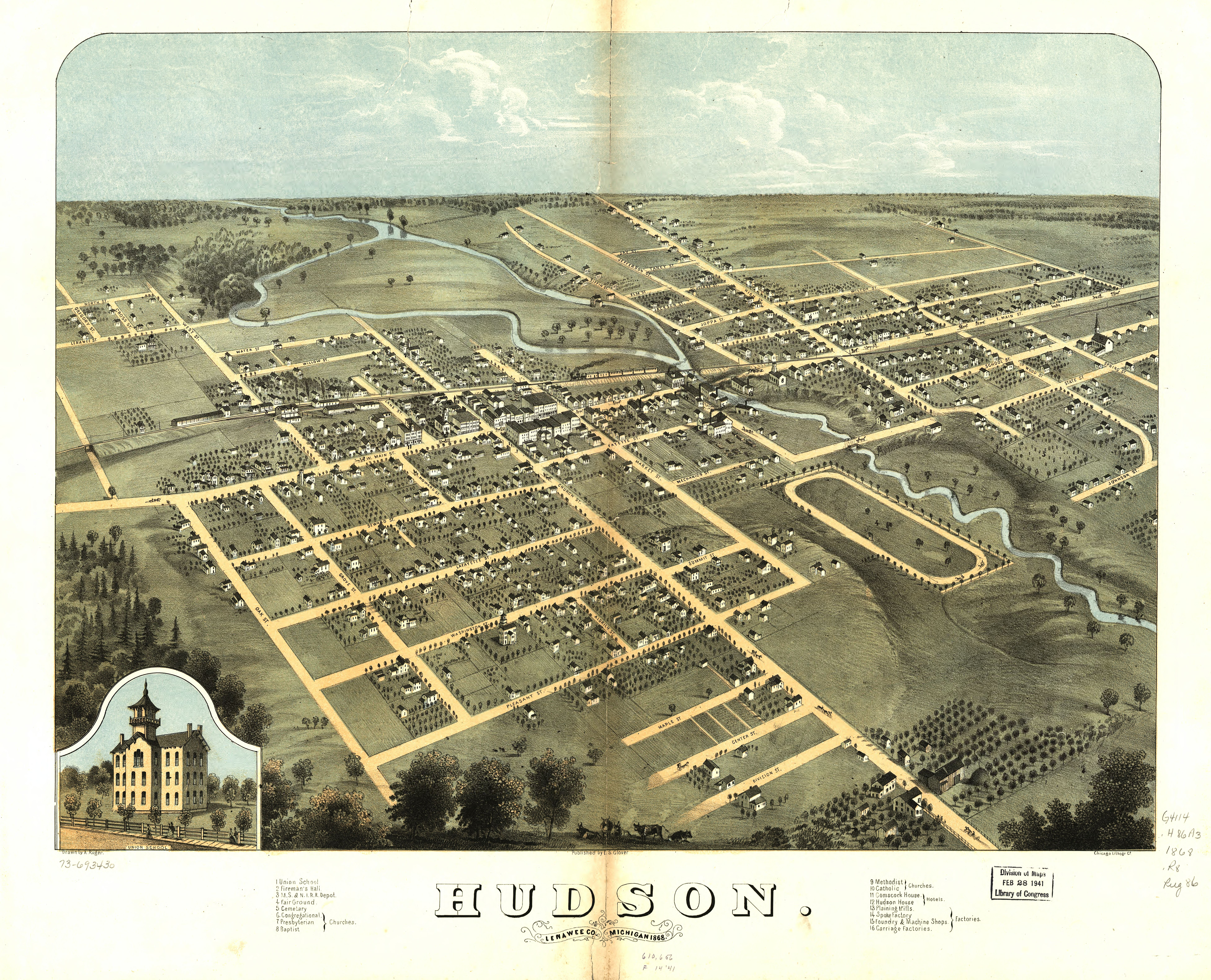
Hudson, Lenawee County, Michigan, 1868, with image of Union School inset; drawn by A. Ruger, published by E.S. Glover, Chicago Lithography Co.

Los Angeles, California, as well as Wilmington and Santa Monica; drawn and published by E.S. Glover Los Angeles, A.L. Bancroft San Francisco

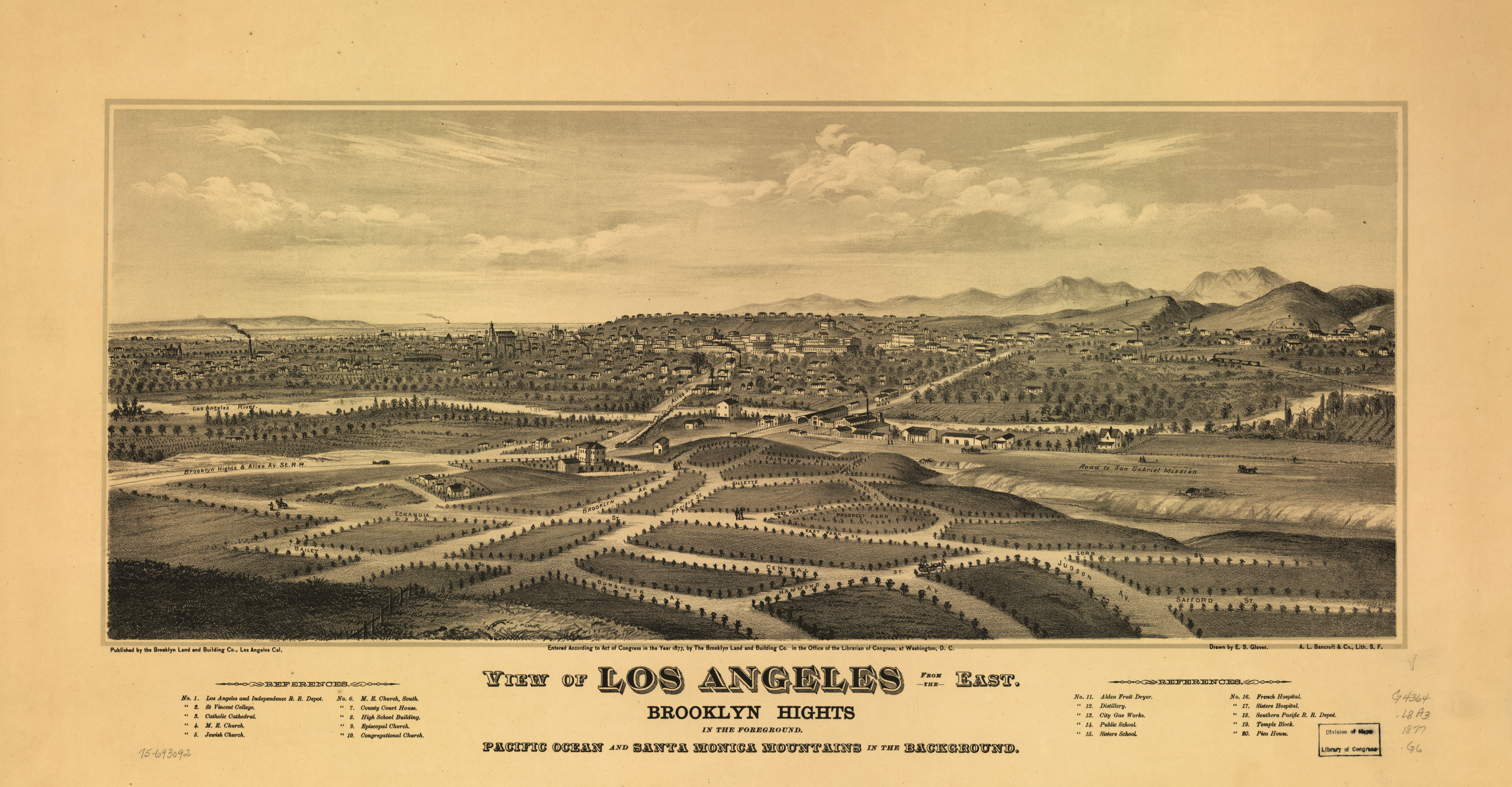
Los Angeles and Brooklyn Heights

Muskegon, Michigan, 1889

Ogden City, Utah

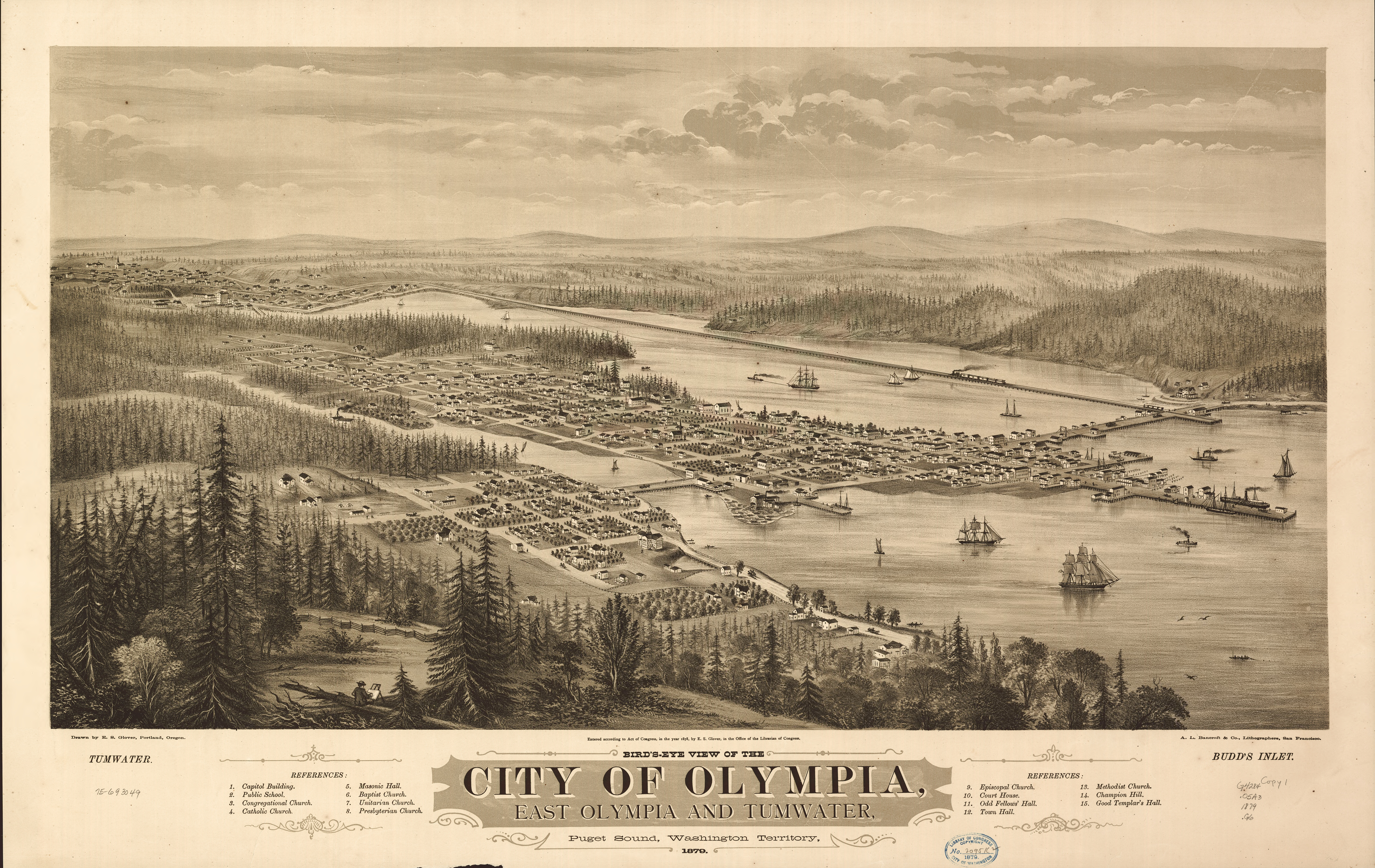
Bird's eye view of the city of Olympia, East Olympia and Tumwater, Puget Sound, Washington Territory, 1879

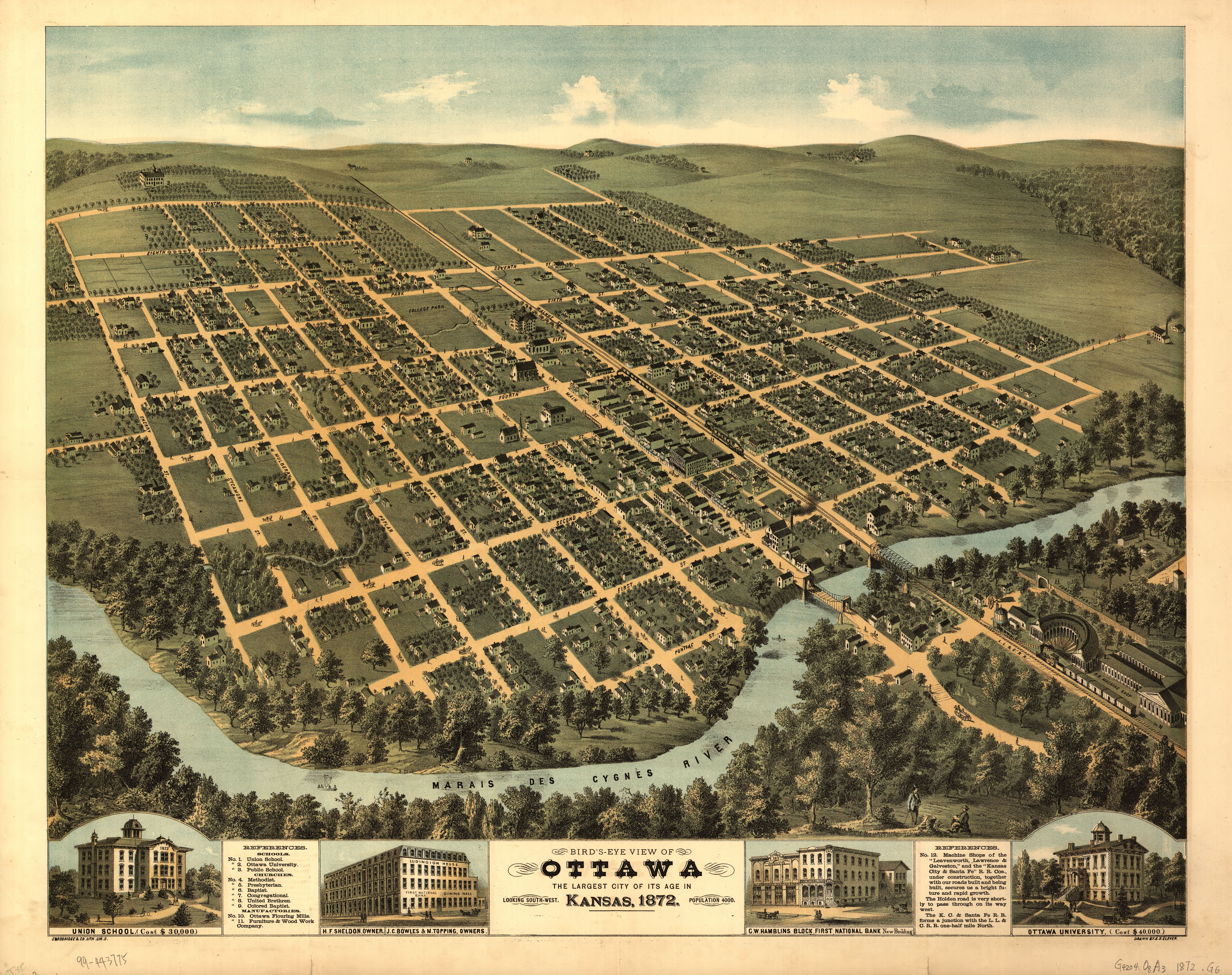
Ottawa, Kansas, 1872

Port Arthur, Texas, 1912

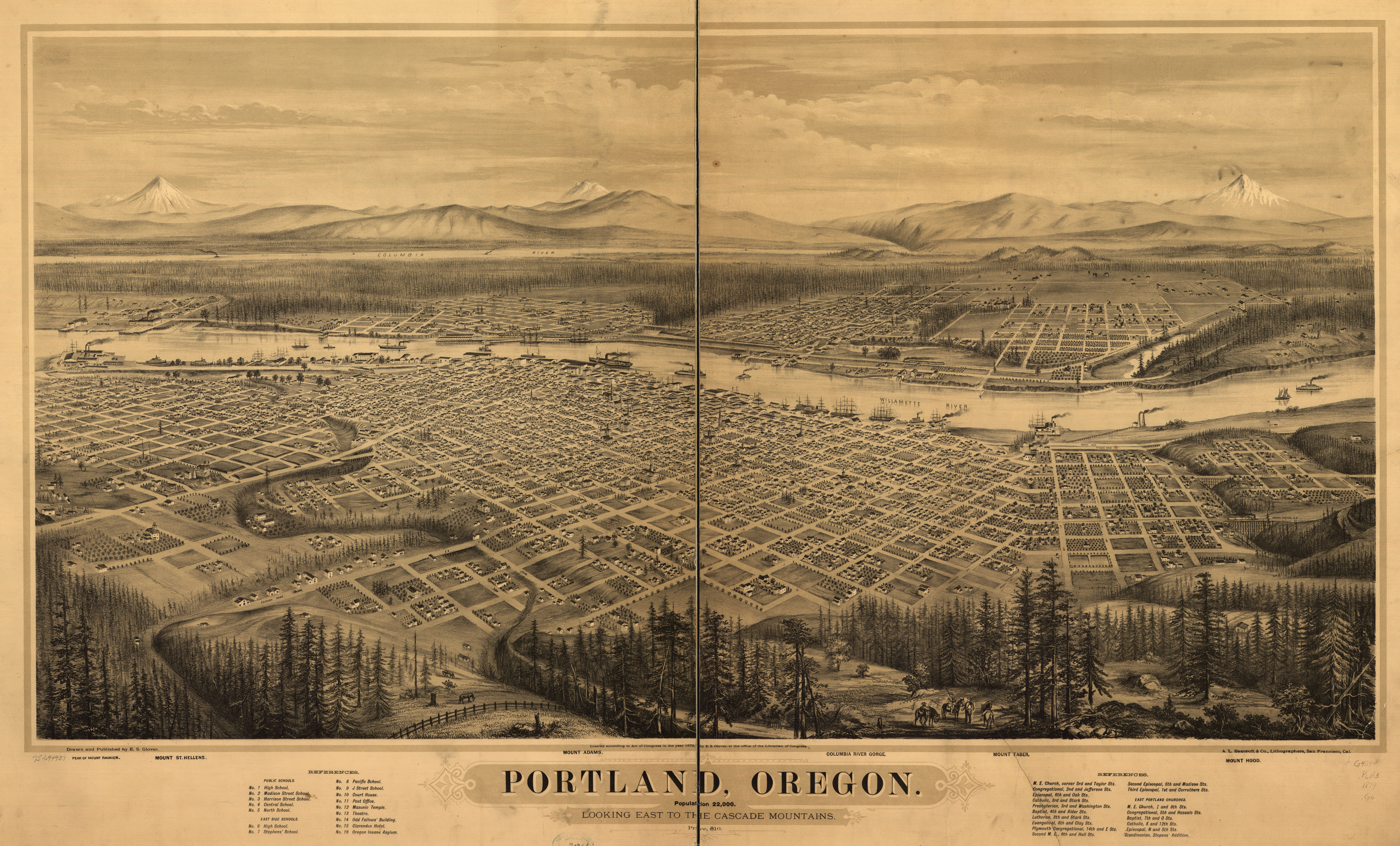
Portland, Oregon, population 22,000; drawn and published by E.S. Glover, A.L. Bancroft & Co. Lithographers, San Francisco

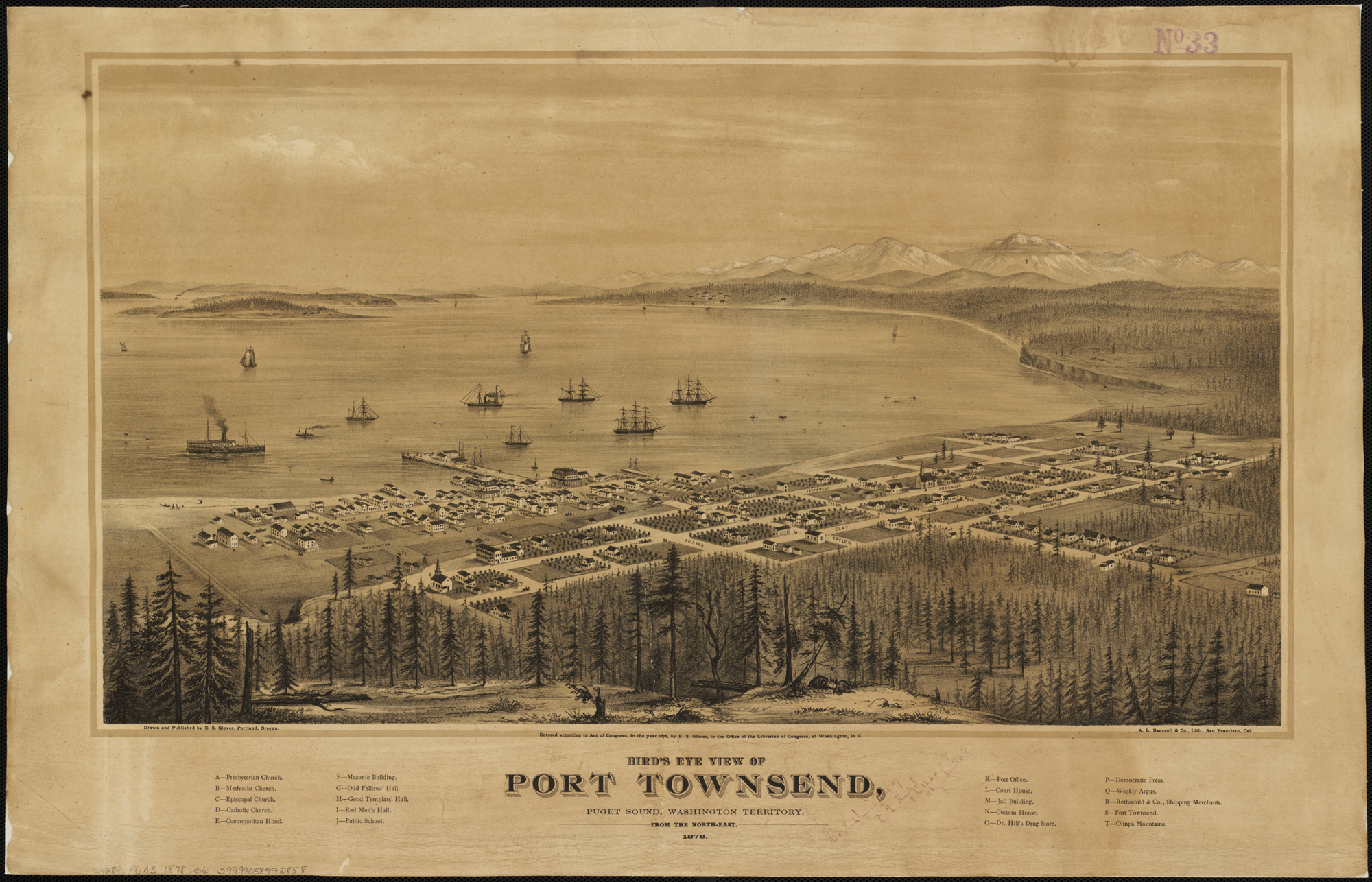
Port Townsend, Puget Sound, Washington Territory, 1878, with list of landmarks; drawn and published by E.S. Glover, Portland, Oregon, A.L. Bancroft & Co., Litho., San Francisco

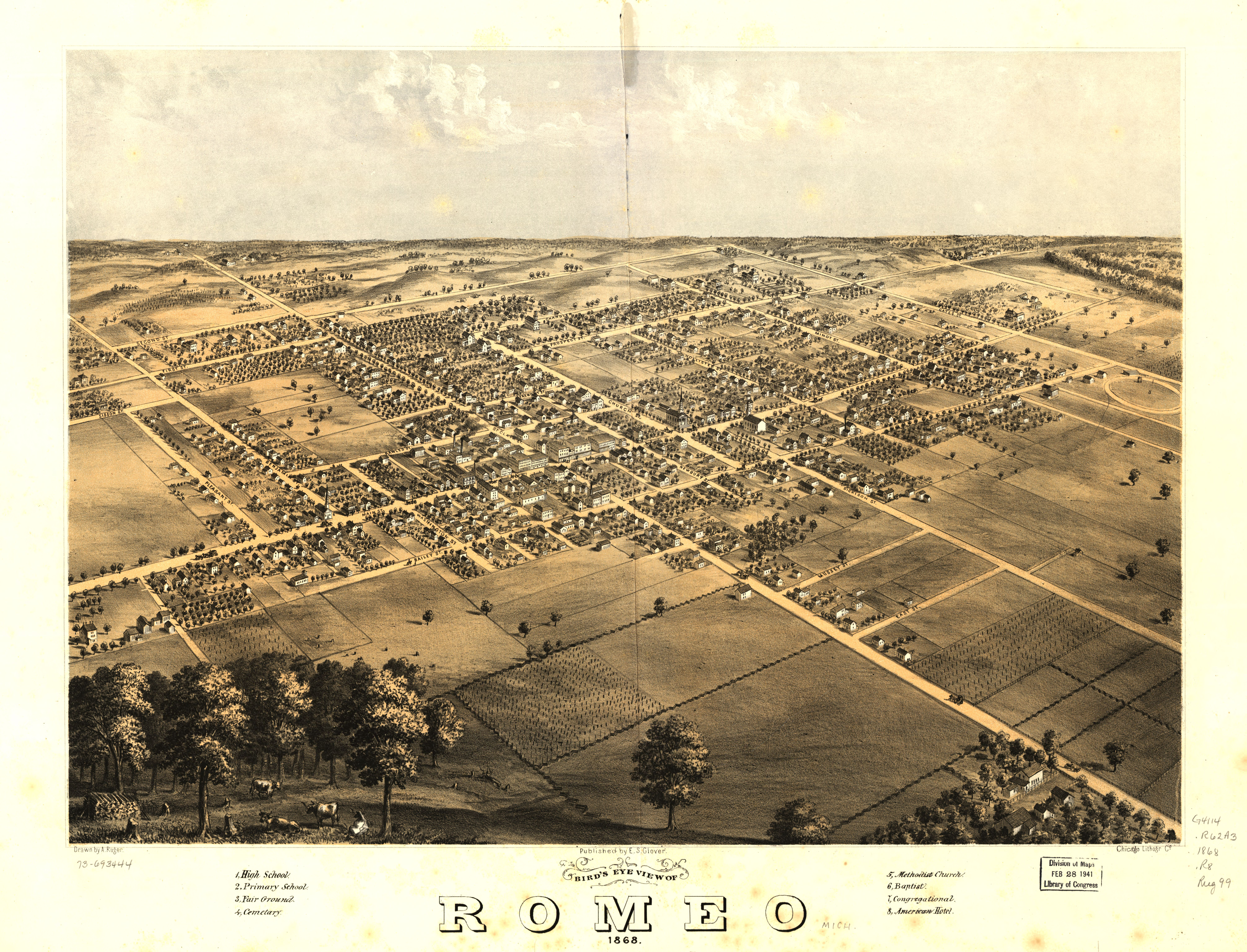
Romeo, Michigan, 1868; published by E.S. Glover

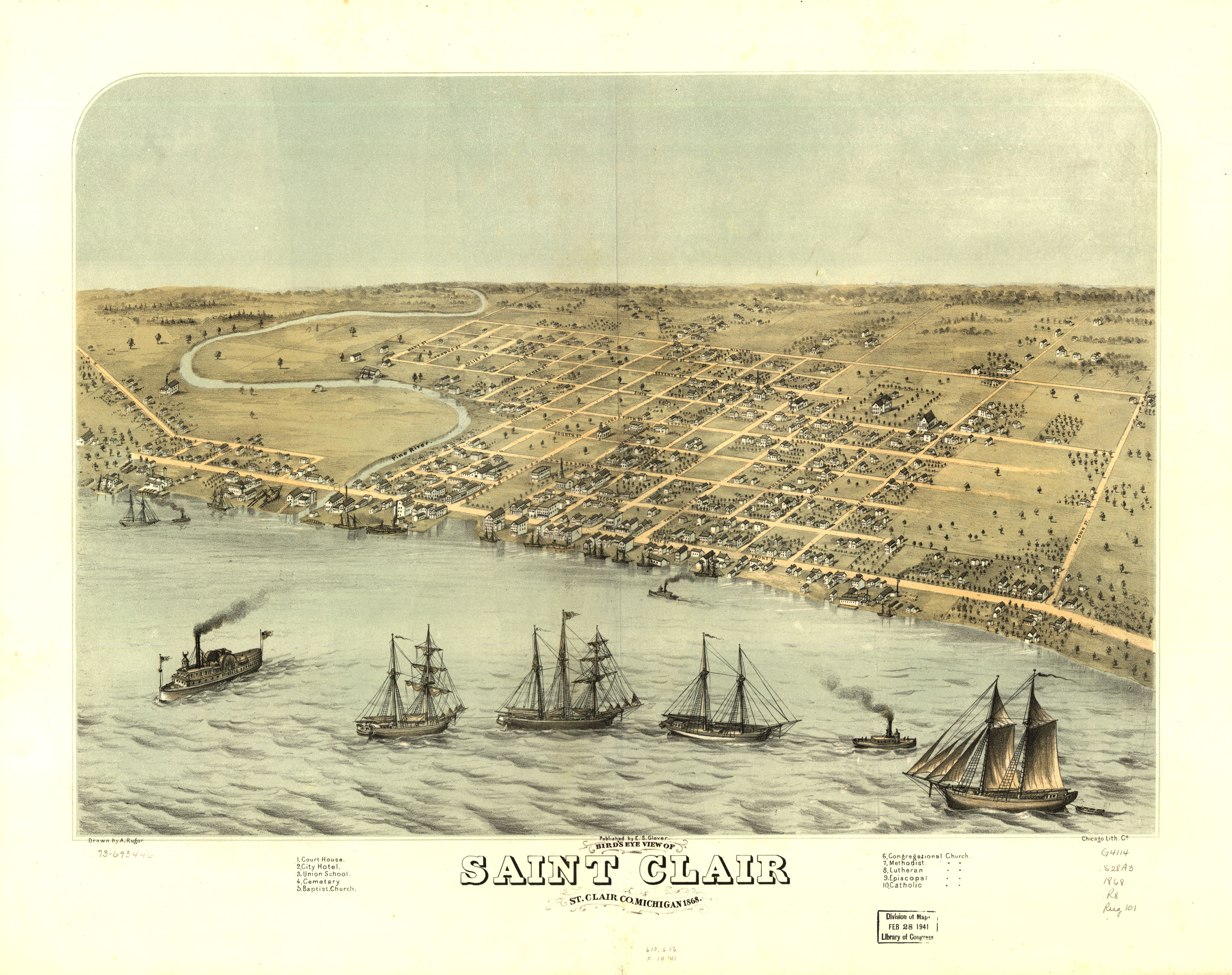
Saint Clair County, Michigan, 1868; published by E.S. Glover

Salem, Oregon

Salt Lake City

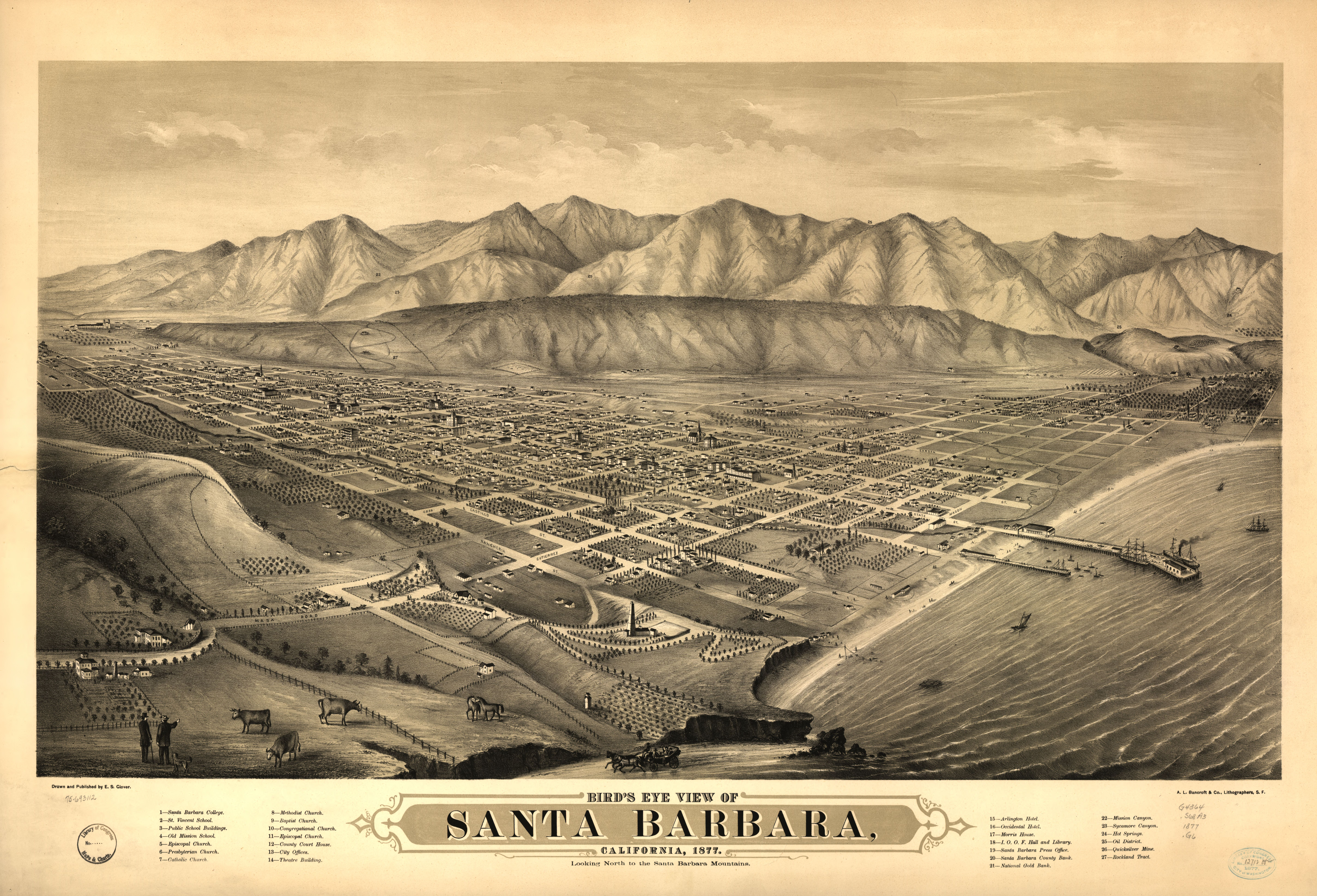
Santa Barbara, California, looking north with Santa Barbara Mountains (Santa Ynez Mountains) in the background, 1877

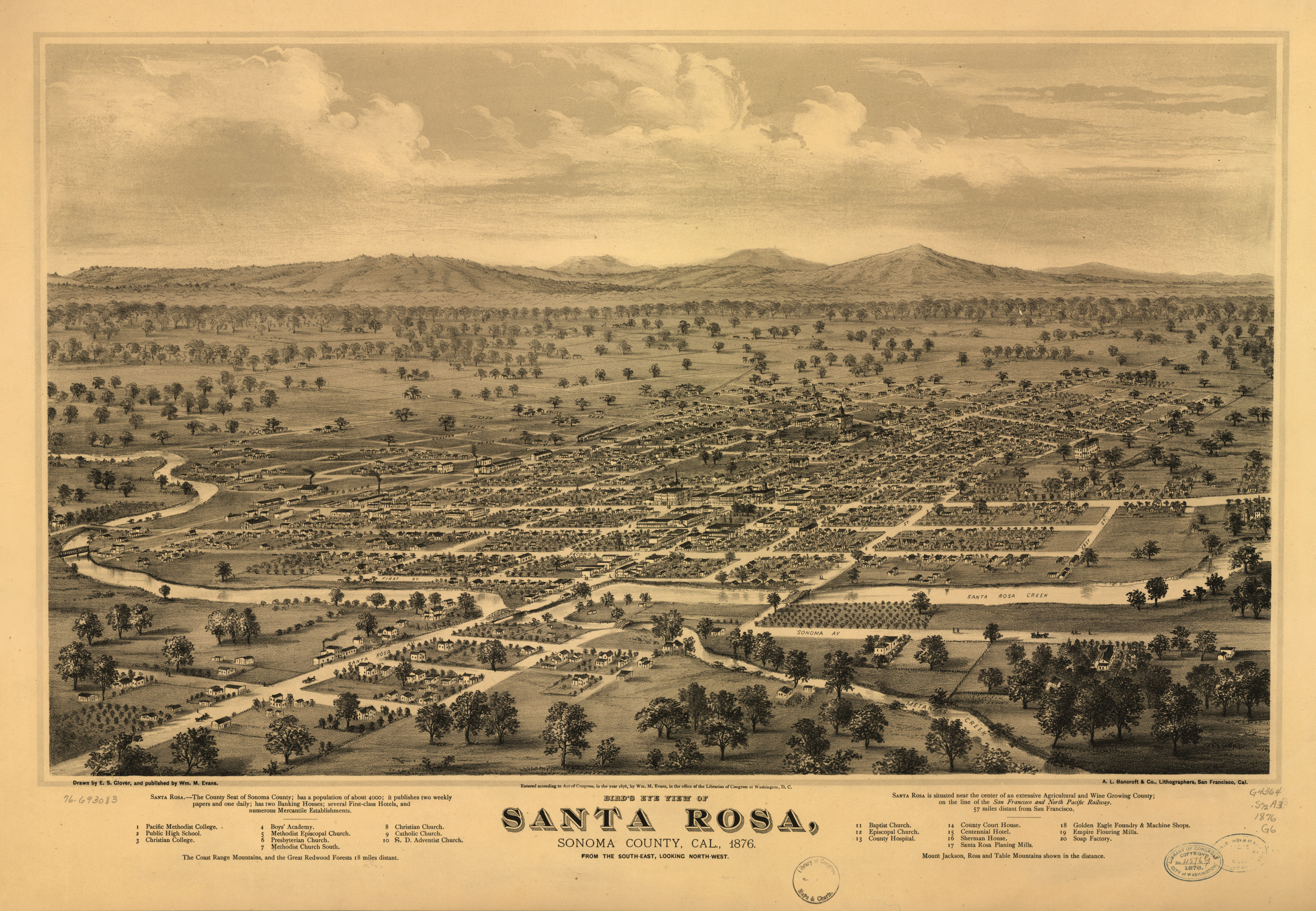
Santa Rosa, California

City of Seattle, Washington Territory, 1878

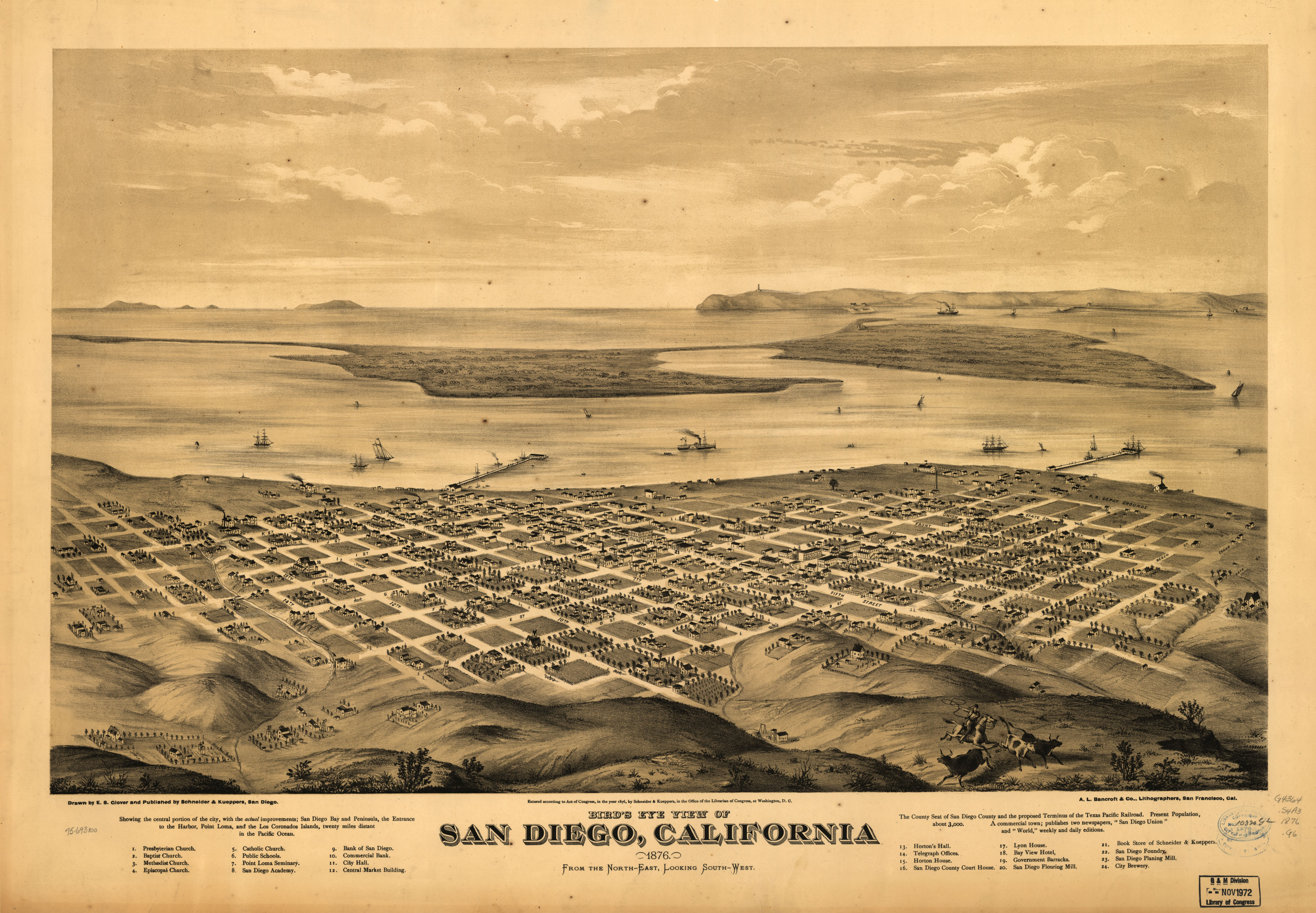
San Diego, California, 1876, with list of landmarks; drawn by E.S. Glover, published by Schneider and & Kueppers, A.L. Bancroft & Co. Lithographers San Francisco

New Tacoma and Mount Rainier, 1877 terminus of the Northern Pacific Railroad; A.L. Bancroft Lithographers San Francisco

Tecumseh, Lenawee County, Michigan, 1868; drawn by A. Ruger, published by E.S. Glover (Eli Sheldon), Chicago Lithographing Co.

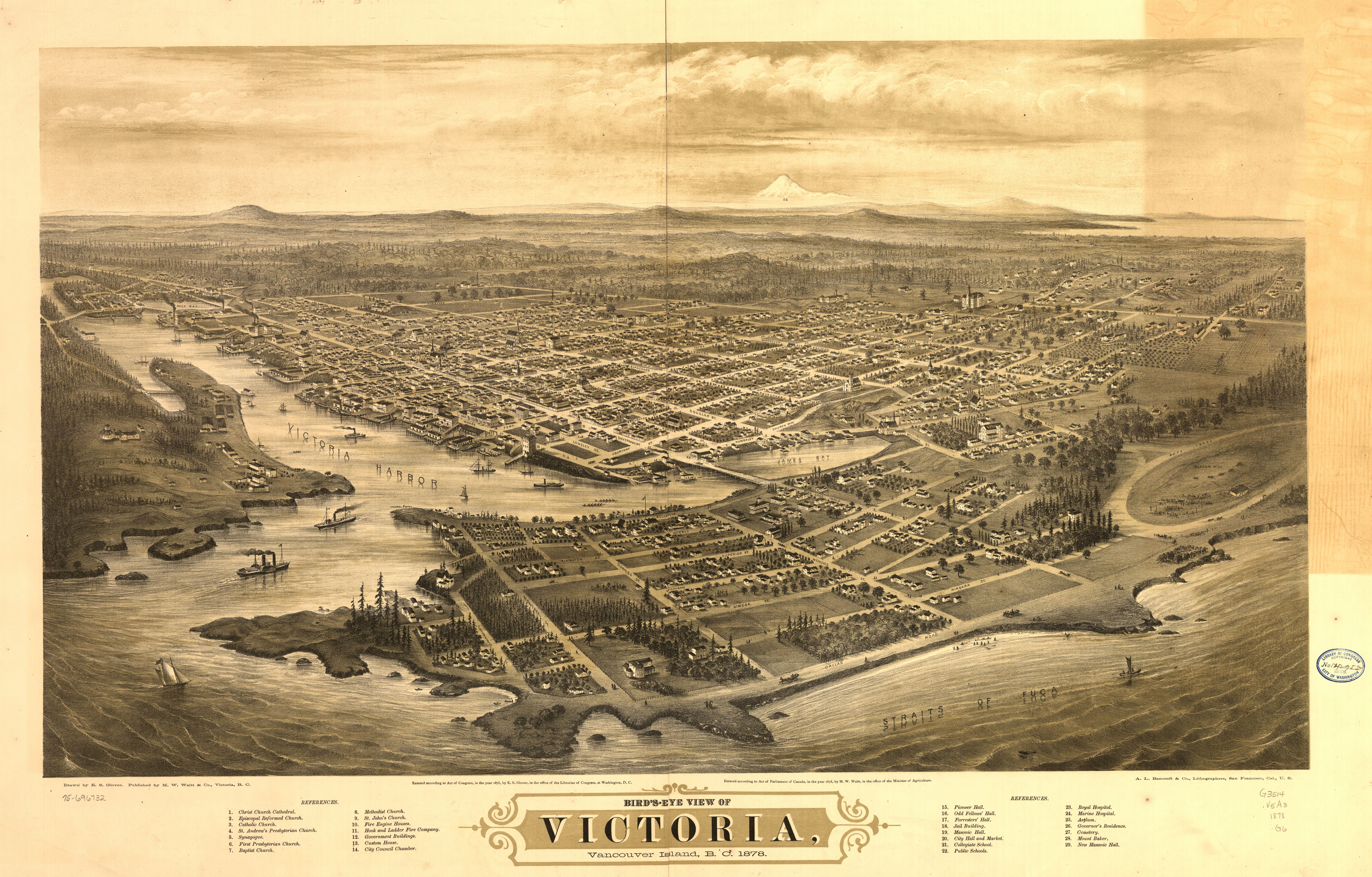
Victoria, Vancouver Island, British Columbia, 1878, with list of landmarks

Walla Walla, Washington Territory, 1876
