= Douglas Glover =

Douglas Glover may refer to:

- Douglas Glover (politician) (1908–1982), British politician
- Douglas Glover (writer) (born 1948), Canadian writer
