= Jose Glover =

Joseph Glover, typically referred to as Jose or Josse, (died late 1638) was an English nonconformist minister, noted for being a pioneer of printing in the English colonies of North America and one of the people instrumental in establishing Harvard College.

Glover was Rector of Sutton, then in the county of Surrey, from 1628 to 1636. He married for the second time in around 1630, marrying Elizabeth Harris, the daughter of Reverend Nathaniel Harris, Rector of Bletchingley in Surrey.

Glover visited New England in around 1634 and garnered support for what would become Harvard College. He managed to purchase a printing press and equipment from securing funds in both England and Holland and signed an agreement with blacksmiths Stephen and Matthew Daye and three workers on 7 June 1638 in Cambridge to ship the equipment to America aboard the John of London ship and later operate it. Glover died of fever while on the voyage back to America later in 1638, but his wife and the Daye brothers were able to continue with his work in setting up a printing press in New England.

The American Antiquary Society document that Glover had written his will on 16 May 1638, and it was approved in the Prerogative Court of Canterbury on 22 December of that year.

Using the equipment that Glover had purchased, now owned by Elizabeth Glover and set up in her home, Daye printed The Free Man's Oath in 1639, which was documentation for an oath of allegiance to the colonists. The Whole Booke of Psalmes, published the following year in 1640, became the first full-length book to be published in the colonies.

Elizabeth remarried in June 1641 to Henry Dunster, Harvard's first president. After her death in 1643, the printing press was donated to Harvard, beginning the Harvard University Press. Jose and Elizabeth Glover's son, John, who also became a graduate of Harvard, was a doctor, and died in 1668.
