= Henry H. Glover =

Australian artist and lithographer

Henry Heath Glover (c. 24 May 1827 – 15 June 1904), was an Australian artist and lithographer, commonly known as Harry Glover, or Henry Glover, jun. while his father (also an artist) was alive.

== History ==
Glover was born in Lambeth, England, the eldest son of Henry "Harry" Glover (c. 1810 – 2 March 1858) and his wife née Gerrard. He served an apprenticeship as lithographer with his father, then gained experience with several London lithographic firms. Sydney George Glover (c. 1828 – 6 January 1908) was a brother.

In 1849 the father and two sons emigrated to Australia, arriving in Port Adelaide on the Calcutta on 23 June 1849. In December 1849 his father took over the licence of Adelaide's Stag Inn, where in October 1851 a brawl broke out which resulted in brother Sydney being charged for manslaughter. The following year Harry joined the gold rush to Victoria, where he spent four years on the diggings, finding time to produce a series of sketches for lithographs which were published in 1855. He married around this time and settled in Carlton. In 1857 Edgar Ray & Co. published his 12 hours road scraping in Melbourne: scraped from the streets and sketched on stone, a book with 12 pages of his lithographs. In 1858 E. L. Robinson published The Intercolonial Cricket Match, a souvenir of the Test between New South Wales and Victoria, with a large lithograph by Glover. Glover next joined the Melbourne engraving firm of De Gruchy & Leigh, then from 1864 to 1868 worked in Christchurch, New Zealand, for Ward and Reeves, proprietors of the Lyttelton Times. While in New Zealand he won an award at the Victorian Exhibition for his chromolithograph Three Marys after Angel announcing the Resurrection of Christ to the three Marys by Annibale Carracci, and designed for Ward and Reeves the winning design for a certificate to be presented at the Otago Exhibition. He also contributed many cartoons to Canterbury Punch. Back in Melbourne and worked for Fergusson & Mitchell.

He was a foundation member of the Victorian Academy of Arts in February 1870 and exhibited two sketches, Diggers Return and Greek Soldier, at the academy's first exhibition, and Sheepwashing in 1872.

He joined the Sydney firm of S. T. Leigh & Co. in March 1870, and was with them for 17 years then in quick succession worked with the Philip-Stephen Photo-Litho Co., Ackhurst & Co., David James & Co. then opened his own business.

Glover died at his son Arthur's house, 8 Oaks Street, North Sydney, on 15 June 1904. He was buried in St Thomas's Church of England Cemetery, North Sydney. Another son, Charles Glover (1863-1938), was a lithographic draughtsman with the Victorian Department of Mines.

== Family ==
He married Johanna Farrell (c. 1835 – 10 October 1871) at Tamworth, New South Wales around 1856; they had four daughters and three sons. Two young children died of scarlatina in 1860, while living at Carlton; their youngest, born around August 1868, died on 6 April 1877. On 10 March 1873, in St. Leonards, New South Wales, he married Jane Elizabeth Clift (c. 1850 – 8 October 1936). They had five children: George, Arthur, Ann, Maud and Caroline.
