= Jimmy Glover =

James Mackey Glover (18 June 1861 – 8 September 1931), originally James Mackey, and known as Jimmy Glover, was an Irish composer, conductor, music critic, and journalist, most notable as Director of Music and conductor at the Theatre Royal, Drury Lane, from 1893 to 1923.

Born in Kingstown, Dublin, he was the son of James Mackey, of Templemore, County Tipperary, a commercial traveller, and of Mary Jane Glover, of Carlow, and a grandson of John William Glover (1815–1899), one of the editors of Thomas Moore's Irish Melodies. Educated at the Catholic University School and Belvedere College, he was then apprenticed to a Dublin druggist, Cornelius Mannin, but in 1879 Jimmy travelled to France with his grandfather, spent three months in a monastery at Caen to improve his French (later reported incorrectly as the Lycée de Caen), then learnt to play the violin under a master in Paris, while also acting as unpaid Paris correspondent of an illustrated London paper called The Entr'acte. In that capacity, he obtained an interview with Victor Hugo. He adopted the name of Glover and followed in his grandfather's footsteps, becoming a composer and conductor. In February 1880 he arrived in London and gained his first position as musical director in Charles Colette's burlesque company. By 1893 he was at the height of his career as Director of Music at the Theatre Royal, Drury Lane. Over a 30-year period Glover worked alongside Arthur Collins and arranged the music for most of his productions, including the Drury Lane pantomimes, and became a significant figure in London's West End. He formed friendships with many leading actors and musical theatre performers and wrote books of memoirs which captured this side of his life. He was also Mayor of Bexhill-on-Sea in 1906–07 and managing director of the Theatre Royal, Plymouth, between 1912 and 1918.

Glover was a friend of the novelist George Augustus Moore. According to Arnold Bennett, Glover told Bennett in 1930 that he was the original of Montgomery in Moore's novel A Mummer's Wife (1885).

His first wife was Alba Fricker, of Buckingham. On 27 August 1910, at Westminster Cathedral, Glover married secondly Kathleen Collins, a daughter of R. Graatz Collins, of Montreal. In 1924, his address was 19, Sackville Street, W1, and he was a member of the National Liberal and Eccentric Clubs.

According to one account, Glover considered the height of his career was being commanded by King George V to arrange a performance in May 1911 of Edward Bulwer-Lytton's play Money, in honour of a visit to England by the Emperor and Empress of Germany.

Glover's second wife died in November 1929. In retirement alone, Glover lived at the Albany Hotel, Robertson Terrace, Hastings, and he died on 8 September 1931, having been visited on his death bed by a brother, described as "Mr. M. J. Glover Mackey, of Liverpool". He left an estate valued at £247.

== Selected publications ==
- The Poet and the Puppets (London: Mitchell, 1892), with Charles Brookfield
- Jimmy Glover, His Book (London: Methuen & Co., 1912)
- Jimmy Glover and his friends (London: Chatto & Windus, 1913)
- Hims Ancient and Modern, being the Third Book of Jimmy Glover (London: T. Fisher Unwin, 1926)
