= Horace Glover =

English footballer (1883–1967)

Personal information
- Full name: Horace Victor Glover
- Date of birth: 1883
- Place of birth: Ashford, Kent, England
- Date of death: 28 January 1967 (aged 84)
- Place of death: Winchester, England
- Position: Full-back

Youth career
- Ashford United

Senior career*
Years	Team	Apps	(Gls)
19??–1906	Hastings & St Leonards United		
1906–1911	Southampton	160	(4)
1911–1913	West Ham United	29	(0)
1913–1914	Boscombe		
- * Club domestic league appearances and goals

Horace Victor Glover (1883 – 28 January 1967) was an English professional footballer who played at left-back for Southampton and West Ham United in the decade prior to World War I.

== Football career ==
Glover was born in Ashford, Kent and trained as an architect's assistant, playing football on an amateur basis for Hastings & St Leonards United. Jimmy Yates, the former Sheffield United and Southampton player was in his second spell at Hastings and recommended Glover to Southampton.

Glover moved along the south coast to join Southampton in the Southern League in May 1906, to replace Arthur Hartshorne who had left in the summer. Glover made his debut at left-back in the opening match of the 1906–07 season, a 1–0 defeat at Swindon Town. He soon established a reputation for "strong, decisive tackling and excellent distribution" and became a permanent fixture at the left of the defence, rarely missing a match over the next two seasons. In 1907, he scored twice in the opening five matches and his form in defence brought him to the attention of Football League clubs, who made "tempting offers" in an attempt to persuade the "Saints" to sell him. In the Cup, he helped Southampton reach the FA Cup Semi Finals in March 1908, where they went out to Wolverhampton Wanderers, having beaten First Division Everton en route.

A series of injuries resulted in him missing large parts of the 1908–09 season, when John Robertson generally stood in for him, but by the start of the following season he was restored to fitness and, now the team's captain, he again became the automatic first-choice at left-back.

In September 1911, he was persuaded to move to London, to join Southern League rivals, West Ham United, where he was re-united with his former Southampton teammate Fred Harrison, who had moved to Upton Park in the spring. Glover made his debut for the "Hammers" in a 5–0 victory over Reading on 23 September, but only spent one season in West Ham's first-team making 29 Southern League and five FA Cup appearances. In the FA Cup, Glover was part of the West Ham team that defeated Middlesbrough of the First Division in the Second Round in February 1912.

After a blank season, when Harry Forster, who had spent six years in the First Division with Sunderland, took over at left-back, Glover joined Boscombe for a season before retiring.

== Later career ==
After the First World War, Glover was employed by his father in law, R.C. Hallett, as a scrap merchant and then as a stevedore in Southampton Docks. During the Second World War, he returned to Ashford, working for the South Eastern and Chatham Railway, until 1945, when he returned to Southampton.
