= Billy Glover =

English footballer

Personal information
- Full name: John William Glover
- Date of birth: 29 October 1896
- Place of birth: Blowick, Southport, England
- Date of death: 19 March 1962 (aged 65)
- Place of death: Southport, England
- Height: 5 ft 9 in (1.75 m)
- Position: Inside forward

Youth career
- St Paul's
- Maple Crescent
- Blowick Working Lads

Senior career*
Years	Team	Apps	(Gls)
1920	Lancaster Town		
1920–1923	Southport	54	(33)
1923–1926	Wigan Borough	94	(33)
1926	Southport	0	(0)
1926–1927	Mold Town		
1927–1928	Burscough Rangers		
- * Club domestic league appearances and goals

John William Glover (29 October 1896 – 19 March 1962) was an English footballer who played for Southport and Wigan Borough.

Born in Blowick, Southport, Glover began his professional career with his hometown club Southport, scoring 33 goals in 54 Football League appearances. before being signed by Wigan Borough in January 1923 for a fee of £1,250. He was Wigan's top scorer in the 1924–25 season, with a total of 15 goals, but broke his leg in the penultimate game of the season against Grimsby Town. He played twice during the following season, but never fully recovered from the injury, effectively ending his career at the professional level.
