= Jonathan Glover =

British philosopher (born 1941)

Jonathan Glover (/ˈɡlʌvər/; born 1941) is a British philosopher known for his books and studies on ethics. He currently teaches ethics at King's College London. Glover is a fellow of the Hastings Center, an independent bioethics research institution in the United States, and is a Distinguished Research Fellow at the Oxford Uehiro Centre for Practical Ethics.

== Education ==
Glover was educated at Tonbridge School, later going on to Corpus Christi College, Oxford. He was a fellow and tutor in philosophy at New College, Oxford, and is now a Distinguished Research Fellow at the Oxford Uehiro Centre for Practical Ethics.

== Career ==
Glover's book Causing Death and Saving Lives, first published in 1977, addresses practical moral questions about life and death decisions in the areas of abortion, infanticide, suicide, euthanasia, choices between people, capital punishment, and issues of war and peace. His approach is broadly consequentialist (utilitarian), though he gives significant weight to questions of individual autonomy, the Kantian notion that we ought to treat other people as ends in themselves rather than merely as means. He criticises the idea that time periods of mere consciousness or life itself are intrinsically valuable: these states matter, he argues, because they are pre-requisites for other things that are valuable and make for a life worth living. There is, then, no absolute sanctity of human life. He criticises the principle of double effect, as well as the acts and omissions doctrine, specifically the notion that there is a huge moral difference between killing someone and intentionally letting them die. He also draws on insights from history and literature, not just strictly from philosophy. On the topic of 20th century war and moral distance, he writes, "There is the feeling that because killing at a distance is easier, one would not have to be such a monster to do it." Throughout, the emphasis is on the consequences of moral choices for those affected, rather than on abstract principles applied impersonally.

In Humanity: A Moral History of the Twentieth Century, published in 1999, Glover considers the psychological factors that predispose us to commit barbaric acts, and suggests how man-made moral traditions and the cultivation of moral imagination can work to restrain us from a ruthlessly selfish treatment of others. Gaining greater understanding of the monsters within us, he argues, is part of the process of caging and containing them. He examines the various types of atrocity that were perpetrated in the 20th century, including Nazi genocide, mass killings under Stalin, Mao, and Pol Pot, and more recent slaughter in Bosnia and Rwanda, and examines what sort of bulwarks there could be against them. He allows that religion has provided bulwarks, which are getting eroded. He identifies three types of bulwark. The two more dependable are sympathy and respect for human dignity. The less dependable third is Moral Identity: "I belong to a kind of person who would not do that sort of thing". This third is less dependable because notions of moral identity can themselves be warped, as was done by the Nazis.

In The End of Faith: Religion, Terror, and the Future of Reason, Sam Harris quotes Glover as saying: "Our entanglements with people close to us erode simple self-interest. Husbands, wives, lovers, parents, children and friends all blur the boundaries of selfish concern. Francis Bacon rightly said that people with children have given hostages to fortune. Inescapably, other forms of friendship and love hold us hostage too...Narrow self-interest is destabilized."

In 1989, the European Commission hired Glover to head a panel on embryo research and assisted reproduction.

In 2018, Glover was awarded the Dan David Prize for his work in bioethics.

== Bibliography ==
=== Books ===
- Glover, Jonathan (1970). Responsibility. London: Routledge. ISBN 0-7100-6879-4. LCCN 72538624.
- Glover, Jonathan (1976). The Philosophy of Mind. Oxford: Oxford University Press. ISBN 0-19-875038-2. LCCN 77362023.
- Glover, Jonathan (1977). Causing Death and Saving Lives. Harmondsworth: Penguin. ISBN 0-14-022003-8. LCCN 78311606.
- Glover, Jonathan (1984). What Sort of People Should There Be?. Harmondsworth: Penguin. ISBN 0-14-022224-3. LCCN 84230104.
- Glover, Jonathan (1988). I: The Philosophy and Psychology of Personal Identity. London: Allen Lane. ISBN 0-7139-9001-5. LCCN 87083462.
- Glover, Jonathan; et al. (1989). Ethics of new reproductive technologies : the Glover report to the European Commission. DeKalb: Northern Illinois University Press. ISBN 0-87580-147-1. LCCN 88034523.
- Glover, Jonathan, ed. (1990). Utilitarianism and Its Critics. New York: Macmillan. ISBN 0-02-344134-8. LCCN 89008279.
- Nussbaum, Martha C.; Glover, Jonathan, eds. (1995). Women, Culture, and Development : A Study of Human Capabilities. Oxford: Clarendon Press. ISBN 0-19-828917-0. LCCN 94042602.
- Glover, Jonathan (1999). Humanity: A Moral History of the Twentieth Century. London: Jonathan Cape. ISBN 0-224-05240-3. LCCN 00274389.
- Glover, Jonathan (2006). Choosing Children: Genes, Disability, and Design. Oxford: Clarendon Press. ISBN 0-19-929092-X. LCCN 2005030309.
- Glover, Jonathan (2014). Alien Landscapes?: Interpreting Disordered Minds. Cambridge: Harvard University Press. ISBN 9780674599185. LCCN 2014005635.B
- Glover, Jonathan (2024). Israelis and Palestinians: From the Cycle of Violence to the Conversation of Mankind. Cambridge: Polity Press. ISBN 978-1-5095-7186-4.

=== Book chapters ===
- Glover, Jonathan (2009), "Identity, violence and the power of illusion", in Kanbur, Ravi; Basu, Kaushik (eds.), Arguments for a better world: essays in honor of Amartya Sen | Volume II: Society, institutions and development, Oxford New York: Oxford University Press, pp. 452–469, ISBN 9780199239979.
