= (Young) Pioneers =

American folk punk band

- Origin: Richmond, Virginia, U.S.
- Genre: Folk punk
- Years active: 1993–1999
- Labels: Lookout!, Vermiform
- Past members: Adam Nathanson; Brooks Headley; Neil Burke; Tim Barry; Marty Key; Jonathan Fuller; Fred LaPier

(Young) Pioneers (alternately stylized as Young Pioneers or The (Young) Pioneers) was an American folk punk band from Richmond, Virginia, active from 1993 to 1999. Composed of members of Born Against, Avail, and Universal Order of Armageddon, they released two albums and numerous singles on Vermiform and Lookout! Records. An overtly political band, their lyrics ranged from "superfluous nods to radical heroes like George Jackson and Carlos the Jackal" to "describ[ing] the relationship between struggling individuals and the machinery of oppressive politics".

== History ==
The band was formed by three former members of the hardcore punk group Born Against: singer and guitarist Adam Nathanson (ex-Life's Blood), drummer Brooks Headley (ex-Universal Order of Armageddon) and harmonica player Neil Burke (ex-Life's Blood). Burke's tenure was brief, and his departure after the group's debut EP on Vermiform Records was followed by Avail singer Tim Barry joining on bass guitar in 1994. Barry was replaced in 1995 by bassist Marty Key, known as Marty Violence, shortly before the group signed to California-based punk rock label Lookout! Records. Headley left the group in 1997 and was briefly replaced by Jonathan Fuller (of Sleepytime Trio) and more permanently by Fred LaPier, who played with the group through their final years. After several tours with bands such as At the Drive-In, Avail, The PeeChees, Karp, and The Locust, they disbanded in February 1999.

Nathanson and Key continued to perform music together under the name Teargas Rock with drummer Randy Davis (of The Great Unraveling), although the group did not release any major releases and is currently on hiatus. Key plays with Ted Leo and the Pharmacists and operates a record shop in Richmond called Steady Sounds. Headley performed in Wrangler Brutes and Skull Control, Fuller in Denali and Engine Down, and Burke in Men's Recovery Project, while Barry remained in Avail and became active as a solo artist.

== Members ==
- Adam Nathanson – vocals, guitar, harmonica, keyboards
- Tim Barry – bass, vocals (1994–1995)
- Marty Key – bass, guitar, drums, vocals, keyboards (1995–1999)
- Neil Burke – harmonica (1993–1994)
- Brooks Headley – drums, vocals (1993–1997)
- Jonathan Fuller – drums (1997)
- Fred LaPier – drums (1997–1999)

== Discography ==
=== Albums ===
- First Virginia Volunteers (1995, Vermiform Records)
- Free the Young Pioneers Now! (1998, Lookout! Records)

=== Compilations ===
- Crimewave E.P. And More (1996, Vermiform Records)
- Write In The (Young) Pioneers (2019, Tiger Force Ultra)

=== EPs and Singles ===
- Young Pioneers (1993, Vermiform Records)
- Food Stamps (1994, Vermiform Records)
- We March! (1995, Vermiform Records)
- Split with The Van Pelt (1995, Whirled Records)
- Employer's Blacklist (1995, Whirled Records/Irony Recordings)
- Crimewave E.P. (1996, Vermiform Records)
- V.M.Live Series Presents.. (1996, V.M.Live Recordings)
- The Fall of Richmond split with Avail (1997, Lookout! Records)
- On Trial (1997, Lookout! Records)
- Split with Drunk (1997, What Else? Records)

=== Compilation appearances ===
- ABCs of Punk (1996, Whirled Records)
- (You're Only As Good As)The Last Great Thing You Did (1997, Lookout! Records)
- Shreds Volume 4: American Underground '96 (1997, Shredder)
- Double Exposure (1998, Go-Kart Records/Black Rat Recordings)
- Richmond, VA - Hooray! (1998)
- Under Your Influence (1998, Tralla Records)
- Mordam 1999 (1999, Mordam Records)
- 1999: Forward Till Death (1999, Lookout! Records)
- U.S. Indies Punx Collection (2000, Two Children Records)
- W.E. 20.0: A What Else? Sampler (2002, What Else? Records)
- Join The Resistance Against War and N.A.T.O! (2008)
