= The Great Unraveling (band) =

American post-punk rock band

- Origin: Baltimore, Maryland, U.S.
- Genres: Post-punk, punk rock
- Years active: 1995–1997
- Labels: Kill Rock Stars, Vermiform Records
- Past members: Tonie Joy; Anthony Scott Malat; Randy Davis; Brooks Headley

The Great Unraveling was an American post-punk rock band from Baltimore, Maryland. The band was fronted by Tonie Joy of Moss Icon, Universal Order of Armageddon, and Born Against. They were active from 1995 to 1997.

== History ==
The Great Unraveling was founded by Joy, bassist Anthony Scott Malat (also of Universal Order of Armageddon), and drummer Randy Davis. Following the success of Universal Order of Armageddon, they quickly gained a small but devoted national fan base.

Their group first released a 7" on the Vermiform Records imprint, run by Sam McPheeters of Born Against. The Olympia-based label Kill Rock Stars released the band's self-titled debut album, recorded by Steve Albini. The group also released a second 7" of material on Joy's Vermin Scum label. Davis departed the band late in their career, and was replaced by Universal Order of Armageddon drummer Brooks Headley.

Malat went on to play with Love Life and Bellmer Dolls, and currently works as a fashion designer. Headley played in various groups, including Skull Kontrol and Wrangler Brutes, and is currently a pastry chef. Joy has been active since the late '90s with his group The Convocation (formerly known as The Convocation Of..). Davis has performed with The Uniform, Fascist Fascist, Teargas Rock and The Thumbs.

== Discography ==
- Space Travel 7" (Vermiform Records)
- The Great Unraveling CD/LP (Kill Rock Stars)
- The Angel Rang Virtue 7" (Vermin Scum Records)
