= 33 1/3 =

Book series of music analysis and criticism

Cover of the Live at the Apollo book

33 1/3 (Thirty-Three and a Third; also stylized as 33 1/3) is a series of books with its first installation in 2003, and is published by Bloomsbury Publishing since 2010. The books are about albums from various musical genres. As of 2025, 196 books have been published in the main series. Six additional series have been published, all of them specific to a region except for one about music genres.

== History and overview ==
Each book of 33 1/3 is about a single album. The series title refers to the rotation speed of a vinyl LP, 33 1/3 revolutions per minute.

Originally published by Continuum, the series was founded by editor David Barker in 2003. At the time, Continuum published a series of short books on literature called Continuum Contemporaries. One-time series editor Ally-Jane Grossan described Barker as "an obsessive music fan who thought, 'This is a really cool idea, why don't we apply this to albums.'" PopMatters wrote that the range consists of "obscure classics to more usual suspects by the Beach Boys, the Beatles, and the Rolling Stones".

In 2010, Continuum was bought out by Bloomsbury Publishing, which continues to publish the series. Following a leave, Barker was replaced by Grossan in January 2013. Leah Babb-Rosenfeld has been the editor of the series since 2016.

Several independent books have been spun off of the series. The first, Carl Wilson's 2007 entry on Celine Dion's Let's Talk About Love, was expanded for a 2014 Bloomsbury reissue with material not specifically pertaining to the Dion album and retitled Let's Talk About Love: Why Other People Have Such Bad Taste. Joe Bonomo, at the invitation of Barker, expanded his 33 1/3 proposal on Jerry Lee Lewis's Live at the Star Club, Hamburg album into a full-length book about Lewis, the album, and his career titled Jerry Lee Lewis: Lost and Found, published by Continuum in 2009. A rejected proposal from writer Brett Milano for an entry on Game Theory's 1987 album Lolita Nation was instead expanded by Milano into a biography on the band's leader Scott Miller; that project, titled Don't All Thank Me at Once: The Lost Genius of Scott Miller, was released by 125 Books in 2015.

In August 2017, Bloomsbury announced the launch of 33 1/3 Global, an extension of the 33 1/3 series to popular music from around the world. The first two sub-series launched were 33 1/3 Brazil, edited by Jason Stanyek, and 33 1/3 Japan, edited by Noriko Manabe. The first book for 33 1/3 Brazil was Caetano Veloso's A Foreign Sound by Barbara Browning. The first books for 33 1/3 Japan were Supercell ft. Hatsune Miku by Keisuke Yamada and Yoko Kanno's Cowboy Bebop Soundtrack by Rose Bridges.

== Published titles ==
As of November 2025, 198 books have been published in the main series.

=== Main series ===
| # | Album | Artist | Year (album) | Year (book) | Author of book | ISBN # |
|---|---|---|---|---|---|---|
| 1 | Dusty in Memphis | Dusty Springfield | 1969 | 2003 | Warren Zanes | 978-0-8264-1492-2 |
| 2 | Forever Changes | Love | 1967 | 2003 | Andrew Hultkrans | 978-0-8264-1493-9 |
| 3 | Harvest | Neil Young | 1972 | 2003 | Sam Inglis | 978-0-8264-1495-3 |
| 4 | The Kinks Are the Village Green Preservation Society | The Kinks | 1968 | 2003 | Andy Miller | 978-0-8264-1498-4 |
| 5 | Meat Is Murder | The Smiths | 1985 | 2003 | Joe Pernice | 978-0-8264-1494-6 |
| 6 | The Piper at the Gates of Dawn | Pink Floyd | 1967 | 2003 | John Cavanagh | 978-0-8264-1497-7 |
| 7 | ABBA Gold: Greatest Hits | ABBA | 1992 | 2004 | Elisabeth Vincentelli | 978-0-8264-1546-2 |
| 8 | Electric Ladyland | The Jimi Hendrix Experience | 1968 | 2004 | John Perry | 978-0-8264-1571-4 |
| 9 | Unknown Pleasures | Joy Division | 1979 | 2004 | Chris Ott | 978-0-8264-1549-3 |
| 10 | Sign o' the Times | Prince | 1987 | 2004 | Michaelangelo Matos | 978-0-8264-1547-9 |
| 11 | The Velvet Underground & Nico | The Velvet Underground | 1967 | 2004 | Joe Harvard | 978-0-8264-1550-9 |
| 12 | Let It Be | The Beatles | 1970 | 2004 | Steve Matteo | 978-0-8264-1634-6 |
| 13 | Live at the Apollo | James Brown | 1963 | 2004 | Douglas Wolk | 978-0-8264-1572-1 |
| 14 | Aqualung | Jethro Tull | 1971 | 2004 | Allan Moore | 978-0-8264-1619-3 |
| 15 | OK Computer | Radiohead | 1997 | 2004 | Dai Griffiths | 978-0-8264-1663-6 |
| 16 | Let It Be | The Replacements | 1984 | 2004 | Colin Meloy | 978-0-8264-1633-9 |
| 17 | Led Zeppelin IV | Led Zeppelin | 1971 | 2005 | Erik Davis | 978-0-8264-1658-2 |
| 18 | Exile on Main St. | The Rolling Stones | 1972 | 2005 | Bill Janovitz | 978-0-8264-1673-5 |
| 19 | Pet Sounds | The Beach Boys | 1966 | 2005 | Jim Fusilli | 978-0-8264-1670-4 |
| 20 | Ramones | Ramones | 1976 | 2005 | Nicholas Rombes | 978-0-8264-1671-1 |
| 21 | Armed Forces | Elvis Costello | 1979 | 2005 | Franklin Bruno | 978-0-8264-1674-2 |
| 22 | Murmur | R.E.M. | 1983 | 2005 | J. Niimi | 978-0-8264-1672-8 |
| 23 | Grace | Jeff Buckley | 1994 | 2005 | Daphne Brooks | 978-0-8264-1635-3 |
| 24 | Endtroducing..... | DJ Shadow | 1996 | 2005 | Eliot Wilder | 978-0-8264-1682-7 |
| 25 | Kick Out the Jams | MC5 | 1969 | 2005 | Don McLeese | 978-0-8264-1660-5 |
| 26 | Low | David Bowie | 1977 | 2005 | Hugo Wilcken | 978-0-8264-1684-1 |
| 27 | Born in the U.S.A. | Bruce Springsteen | 1984 | 2005 | Geoffrey Himes | 978-0-8264-1661-2 |
| 28 | Music from Big Pink | The Band | 1968 | 2005 | John Niven | 978-0-8264-1771-8 |
| 29 | In the Aeroplane Over the Sea | Neutral Milk Hotel | 1998 | 2005 | Kim Cooper | 978-0-8264-1690-2 |
| 30 | Paul's Boutique | Beastie Boys | 1989 | 2006 | Dan Le Roy | 978-0-8264-1741-1 |
| 31 | Doolittle | Pixies | 1989 | 2006 | Ben Sisario | 978-0-8264-1774-9 |
| 32 | There's a Riot Goin' On | Sly and the Family Stone | 1971 | 2006 | Miles Marshall Lewis | 978-0-8264-1744-2 |
| 33 | The Stone Roses | The Stone Roses | 1989 | 2006 | Alex Green | 978-0-8264-1742-8 |
| 34 | In Utero | Nirvana | 1993 | 2006 | Gillian G. Gaar | 978-0-8264-1776-3 |
| 35 | Highway 61 Revisited | Bob Dylan | 1965 | 2006 | Mark Polizzotti | 978-0-8264-1775-6 |
| 36 | Loveless | My Bloody Valentine | 1991 | 2006 | Mike McGonigal | 978-0-8264-1548-6 |
| 37 | The Who Sell Out | The Who | 1967 | 2006 | John Dougan | 978-0-8264-1743-5 |
| 38 | Bee Thousand | Guided by Voices | 1994 | 2006 | Marc Woodworth | 978-0-8264-1748-0 |
| 39 | Daydream Nation | Sonic Youth | 1988 | 2006 | Matthew Stearns | 978-0-8264-1740-4 |
| 40 | Court and Spark | Joni Mitchell | 1974 | 2006 | Sean Nelson | 978-0-8264-1773-2 |
| 41 | Use Your Illusion I and II | Guns N' Roses | 1991 | 2006 | Eric Weisbard | 978-0-8264-1924-8 |
| 69 (Note: Intentionally mis-numbered) | 69 Love Songs | The Magnetic Fields | 1999 | 2006 | LD Beghtol | 978-0-8264-1925-5 |
| 42 | Songs in the Key of Life | Stevie Wonder | 1976 | 2007 | Zeth Lundy | 978-0-8264-1926-2 |
| 43 | The Notorious Byrd Brothers | The Byrds | 1968 | 2007 | Ric Menck | 978-0-8264-1717-6 |
| 44 | Trout Mask Replica | Captain Beefheart | 1969 | 2007 | Kevin Courrier | 978-0-8264-2781-6 |
| 45 | Double Nickels on the Dime | Minutemen | 1984 | 2007 | Michael T. Fournier | 978-0-8264-2787-8 |
| 46 | Aja | Steely Dan | 1977 | 2007 | Don Breithaupt | 978-0-8264-2783-0 |
| 47 | People's Instinctive Travels and the Paths of Rhythm | A Tribe Called Quest | 1990 | 2007 | Shawn Taylor | 978-0-8264-1923-1 |
| 48 | Rid of Me | PJ Harvey | 1993 | 2007 | Kate Schatz | 978-0-8264-2778-6 |
| 49 | Achtung Baby | U2 | 1991 | 2007 | Stephen Catanzarite | 978-0-8264-2784-7 |
| 50 | If You're Feeling Sinister | Belle & Sebastian | 1996 | 2007 | Scott Plagenhoef | 978-0-8264-2818-9 |
| 51 | Pink Moon | Nick Drake | 1972 | 2007 | Amanda Petrusich | 978-0-8264-2790-8 |
| 52 | Let's Talk About Love | Celine Dion | 1997 | 2007 | Carl Wilson | 978-0-8264-2788-5 |
| 53 | Swordfishtrombones | Tom Waits | 1983 | 2007 | David Smay | 978-0-8264-2782-3 |
| 54 | 20 Jazz Funk Greats | Throbbing Gristle | 1979 | 2008 | Drew Daniel | 978-0-8264-2793-9 |
| 55 | Horses | Patti Smith | 1975 | 2008 | Philip Shaw | 978-0-8264-2792-2 |
| 56 | Master of Reality | Black Sabbath | 1971 | 2008 | John Darnielle | 978-0-8264-2899-8 |
| 57 | Reign in Blood | Slayer | 1986 | 2008 | D.X. Ferris | 978-0-8264-2909-4 |
| 58 | Shoot Out the Lights | Richard and Linda Thompson | 1982 | 2008 | Hayden Childs | 978-0-8264-2791-5 |
| 59 | Gentlemen | The Afghan Whigs | 1993 | 2008 | Bob Gendron | 978-0-8264-2910-0 |
| 60 | Rum, Sodomy, and the Lash | The Pogues | 1985 | 2008 | Jeffrey T. Roesgen | 978-0-8264-2916-2 |
| 61 | The Gilded Palace of Sin | The Flying Burrito Brothers | 1969 | 2008 | Bob Proehl | 978-0-8264-2903-2 |
| 62 | Pink Flag | Wire | 1977 | 2009 | Wilson Neate | 978-0-8264-2914-8 |
| 63 | XO | Elliott Smith | 1998 | 2009 | Mathew Lemay | 978-0-8264-2900-1 |
| 64 | Illmatic | Nas | 1994 | 2009 | Matthew Gasteier | 978-0-8264-2907-0 |
| 65 | Radio City | Big Star | 1974 | 2009 | Bruce Eaton | 978-0-8264-2898-1 |
| 66 | One Step Beyond... | Madness | 1979 | 2009 | Terry Edwards | 978-0-8264-2906-3 |
| 67 | Another Green World | Brian Eno | 1975 | 2009 | Geeta Dayal | 978-0-8264-2786-1 |
| 68 | Zaireeka | The Flaming Lips | 1997 | 2009 | Mark Richardson | 978-0-8264-2901-8 |
| 70 | Facing Future | Israel Kamakawiwoʻole | 1993 | 2009 | Dan Kois | 978-0-8264-2905-6 |
| 71 | It Takes a Nation of Millions to Hold Us Back | Public Enemy | 1988 | 2010 | Christopher R. Weingarten | 978-0-8264-2913-1 |
| 72 | Wowee Zowee | Pavement | 1995 | 2010 | Bryan Charles | 978-0-8264-2957-5 |
| 73 | Highway to Hell | AC/DC | 1979 | 2010 | Joe Bonomo | 978-1-4411-9028-4 |
| 74 | Song Cycle | Van Dyke Parks | 1968 | 2010 | Richard Henderson | 978-0-8264-2917-9 |
| 75 | Spiderland | Slint | 1991 | 2010 | Scott Tennent | 978-1-4411-7026-2 |
| 76 | Kid A | Radiohead | 2000 | 2010 | Marvin Lin | 978-0-8264-2343-6 |
| 77 | Tusk | Fleetwood Mac | 1979 | 2011 | Rob Trucks | 978-0-8264-2902-5 |
| 78 | Pretty Hate Machine | Nine Inch Nails | 1989 | 2011 | Daphne Carr | 978-0-8264-2789-2 |
| 79 | Chocolate and Cheese | Ween | 1994 | 2011 | Hank Shteamer | 978-0-8264-3117-2 |
| 80 | American Recordings | Johnny Cash | 1994 | 2011 | Tony Tost | 978-1-4411-7461-1 |
| 81 | Some Girls | The Rolling Stones | 1978 | 2011 | Cyrus Patell | 978-1-4411-9280-6 |
| 82 | You're Living All Over Me | Dinosaur Jr. | 1987 | 2011 | Nick Attfield | 978-1-4411-8778-9 |
| 83 | Marquee Moon | Television | 1977 | 2011 | Bryan Waterman | 978-1-4411-8605-8 |
| 84 | Amazing Grace | Aretha Franklin | 1972 | 2011 | Aaron Cohen | 978-1-4411-4888-9 |
| 85 | Dummy | Portishead | 1994 | 2011 | RJ Wheaton | 978-1-4411-9449-7 |
| 86 | Fear of Music | Talking Heads | 1979 | 2012 | Jonathan Lethem | 978-1-4411-2100-4 |
| 87 | Histoire de Melody Nelson | Serge Gainsbourg | 1971 | 2013 | Darran Anderson | 978-1-62356-287-8 |
| 88 | Flood | They Might Be Giants | 1990 | 2013 | S. Alexander Reed; Elizabeth Sandifer | 978-1-62356-915-0 |
| 89 | I Get Wet | Andrew W.K. | 2001 | 2014 | Phillip Crandall | 978-1-62356-714-9 |
| 90 | Selected Ambient Works Volume II | Aphex Twin | 1994 | 2014 | Marc Weidenbaum | 978-1-62356-890-0 |
| 91 | Entertainment! | Gang of Four | 1979 | 2014 | Kevin Dettmar | 978-1-62356-065-2 |
| 92 | Blank Generation | Richard Hell and the Voidoids | 1977 | 2014 | Pete Astor | 978-1-62356-122-2 |
| 93 | Donuts | J Dilla | 2006 | 2014 | Jordan Ferguson | 978-1-62356-183-3 |
| 94 | Smile | The Beach Boys | N/A (Note: The original Smile album remains unfinished; not to be confused with The Smile Sessions (2011) box set) | 2014 | Luis Sanchez | 978-1-62356-258-8 |
| 95 | Definitely Maybe | Oasis | 1994 | 2014 | Alex Niven | 978-1-62356-423-0 |
| 96 | Exile in Guyville | Liz Phair | 1993 | 2014 | Gina Arnold | 978-1-4411-6257-1 |
| 97 | My Beautiful Dark Twisted Fantasy | Kanye West | 2010 | 2014 | Kirk Walker Graves | 978-1-62356-542-8 |
| 98 | The Grey Album | Danger Mouse | 2004 | 2014 | Charles Fairchild | 978-1-62356-660-9 |
| 99 | ( ) | Sigur Rós | 2002 | 2014 | Ethan Hayden | 978-1-62356-892-4 |
| 100 | Dangerous | Michael Jackson | 1991 | 2014 | Susan Fast | 978-1-62356-631-9 |
| 101 | Tago Mago | Can | 1971 | 2014 | Alan Warner | 978-1-62892-108-3 |
| 102 | Ode to Billie Joe | Bobbie Gentry | 1967 | 2014 | Tara Murtha | 978-1-62356-964-8 |
| 103 | Live Through This | Hole | 1994 | 2014 | Anwen Crawford | 978-1-6235-6762-0 |
| 104 | Freedom of Choice | Devo | 1980 | 2015 | Evie Nagy | 978-1-6235-6344-8 |
| 105 | Fresh Fruit for Rotting Vegetables | Dead Kennedys | 1980 | 2015 | Michael Stewart | 978-1-6235-6730-9 |
| 106 | Koji Kondo's Super Mario Bros. Soundtrack | Koji Kondo | 1985 | 2015 | Andrew Schartmann | 978-1-6289-2853-2 |
| 107 | Beat Happening | Beat Happening | 1985 | 2015 | Bryan C. Parker | 978-1-62892-927-0 |
| 108 | Metallica | Metallica | 1991 | 2015 | David Masciotra | 978-1-62892-930-0 |
| 109 | A Live One | Phish | 1995 | 2015 | Walter Holland | 978-1-62892-938-6 |
| 110 | Bitches Brew | Miles Davis | 1970 | 2015 | George Grella | 978-1-62892-943-0 |
| 111 | Parallel Lines | Blondie | 1978 | 2016 | Kembrew McLeod | 978-1-5013-0237-4 |
| 112 | Workingman's Dead | Grateful Dead | 1970 | 2016 | Buzz Poole | 978-1-62892-924-9 |
| 113 | Hangin' Tough | New Kids on the Block | 1988 | 2016 | Rebecca Wallwork | 978-1-62892-973-7 |
| 114 | The Geto Boys | The Geto Boys | 1990 | 2016 | Rolf Potts | 978-1-62892-946-1 |
| 115 | Dig Me Out | Sleater-Kinney | 1997 | 2016 | Jovana Babovic | 978-1-62892-976-8 |
| 116 | Sound of Silver | LCD Soundsystem | 2007 | 2016 | Ryan Leas | 978-1-5013-2561-8 |
| 117 | Live | Donny Hathaway | 1972 | 2016 | Emily Lordi | 978-1-62892-980-5 |
| 118 | Psychocandy | The Jesus and Mary Chain | 1985 | 2016 | Paula Mejia | 978-1-62892-950-8 |
| 119 | The Modern Lovers | The Modern Lovers | 1976 | 2017 | Sean Maloney | 978-1-5013-2218-1 |
| 120 | Soundtrack from Twin Peaks | Angelo Badalamenti | 1990 | 2017 | Clare Nina Norelli | 978-1-5013-2301-0 |
| 121 | Colossal Youth | Young Marble Giants | 1980 | 2017 | Michael Blair; Joe Bucciero | 978-1-5013-2114-6 |
| 122 | Bizarre Ride II the Pharcyde | The Pharcyde | 1992 | 2017 | Andrew Barker | 978-1-5013-2127-6 |
| 123 | The Suburbs | Arcade Fire | 2010 | 2017 | Eric Eidelstein | 978-1-5013-3646-1 |
| 124 | Workbook | Bob Mould | 1989 | 2017 | Walter Biggins; Daniel Couch | 978-1-5013-2135-1 |
| 125 | Uptown Saturday Night | Camp Lo | 1997 | 2017 | Patrick Rivers; Will Fulton | 978-1-5013-2272-3 |
| 126 | The Raincoats | The Raincoats | 1979 | 2017 | Jenn Pelly | 978-1-5013-0240-4 |
| 127 | Homogenic | Björk | 1997 | 2017 | Emily Mackay | 978-1-5013-2274-7 |
| 128 | Okie from Muskogee | Merle Haggard | 1969 | 2018 | Rachel Rubin | 978-1-5013-2143-6 |
| 129 | In on the Kill Taker | Fugazi | 1993 | 2018 | Joe Gross | 978-1-5013-2139-9 |
| 130 | 24 Hour Revenge Therapy | Jawbreaker | 1994 | 2018 | Ronen Givony | 978-1-5013-2309-6 |
| 131 | Transformer | Lou Reed | 1972 | 2018 | Ezra Furman | 978-1-5013-2305-8 |
| 132 | Peepshow | Siouxsie and the Banshees | 1988 | 2018 | Samantha Bennett | 978-1-5013-2186-3 |
| 133 | Southern Rock Opera | Drive-By Truckers | 2001 | 2018 | Rien Fertel | 978-1-5013-3178-7 |
| 134 | Jesus Freak | DC Talk | 1995 | 2018 | Will Stockton; D. Gilson | 978-1-5013-3166-4 |
| 135 | Boys for Pele | Tori Amos | 1996 | 2018 | Amy Gentry | 978-1-5013-2131-3 |
| 136 | One Grain of Sand | Odetta | 1963 | 2019 | Matthew Frye | 978-1-5013-3332-3 |
| 137 | The Holy Bible | Manic Street Preachers | 1994 | 2019 | David Evans | 978-1-5013-3170-1 |
| 138 | Golden Hits of the Shangri-Las | The Shangri-Las | 1966 | 2019 | Ada Wolin | 978-1-5013-3174-9 |
| 139 | Southern Accents | Tom Petty and the Heartbreakers | 1985 | 2019 | Michael Washburn | 978-1-5013-3344-6 |
| 140 | Blue Lines | Massive Attack | 1991 | 2019 | Ian Bourland | 978-1-5013-3969-1 |
| 141 | Switched-On Bach | Wendy Carlos | 1968 | 2019 | Roshanak Kheshti | 978-1-5013-2028-6 |
| 142 | The Wild Tchoupitoulas | The Wild Tchoupitoulas | 1976 | 2019 | Bryan Wagner | 978-1-5013-3336-1 |
| 143 | Diamond Dogs | David Bowie | 1974 | 2020 | Glenn Hendler | 978-1-5013-3658-4 |
| 144 | Voodoo | D'Angelo | 2000 | 2020 | Faith A. Pennick | 978-1-5013-3650-8 |
| 145 | Judy at Carnegie Hall | Judy Garland | 1961 | 2020 | Manuel Betancourt | 978-1-5013-5510-3 |
| 146 | Blue Moves | Elton John | 1976 | 2020 | Matthew Restall | 978-1-5013-5542-4 |
| 147 | I'm Your Fan: The Songs of Leonard Cohen | Various artists | 1991 | 2020 | Ray Padgett | 978-1-5013-5506-6 |
| 148 | The Velvet Rope | Janet Jackson | 1997 | 2020 | Ayanna Dozier | 978-1-5013-5502-8 |
| 149 | Suicide | Suicide | 1977 | 2020 | Andi Coulter | 978-1-5013-5566-0 |
| 150 | From Elvis in Memphis | Elvis Presley | 1969 | 2020 | Eric Wolfson | 978-1-5013-5538-7 |
| 151 | Murder Ballads | Nick Cave and the Bad Seeds | 1996 | 2020 | Santi Elijah Holley | 978-1-5013-5514-1 |
| 152 | Ghetto: Misfortune's Wealth | 24-Carat Black | 1973 | 2020 | Zach Schonfeld | 978-1-5013-5550-9 |
| 153 | Tapestry | Carole King | 1971 | 2021 | Loren Glass | 978-1-5013-5562-2 |
| 154 | Vs. | Pearl Jam | 1993 | 2021 | Clint Brownlee | 978-1-5013-5530-1 |
| 155 | Avalon | Roxy Music | 1982 | 2021 | Simon A. Morrison | 978-1-5013-5534-9 |
| 156 | Rio | Duran Duran | 1982 | 2021 | Annie Zaleski | 978-1-5013-5518-9 |
| 157 | Once Upon a Time | Donna Summer | 1977 | 2021 | Alex Jeffery | 978-1-5013-5546-2 |
| 158 | Live at the Harlem Square Club, 1963 | Sam Cooke | 1985 | 2021 | Colin Fleming | 978-1-5013-5554-7 |
| 159 | The ArchAndroid | Janelle Monáe | 2010 | 2021 | Alyssa Favreau | 978-1-5013-5570-7 |
| 160 | John Prine | John Prine | 1971 | 2021 | Erin Osmon | 978-1-5013-7923-9 |
| 161 | Lyric & Coloratura Arias | Maria Callas | 1954 | 2021 | Ginger Dellenbaugh | 978-1-5013-7902-4 |
| 162 | Boxer | The National | 2007 | 2022 | Ryan Pinkard | 978-1-5013-7803-4 |
| 163 | Computer World | Kraftwerk | 1981 | 2022 | Steve Tupai Francis | 978-1-5013-7898-0 |
| 164 | Moon Pix | Cat Power | 1998 | 2022 | Donna Kozloskie | 978-1-5013-7793-8 |
| 165 | Faith | George Michael | 1987 | 2022 | Matthew Horton | 978-1-5013-7797-6 |
| 166 | To Pimp a Butterfly | Kendrick Lamar | 2015 | 2022 | Sequoia L. Maner | 978-1-5013-7747-1 |
| 167 | Blackout | Britney Spears | 2007 | 2022 | Natasha Lasky | 978-1-5013-7759-4 |
| 168 | That's the Way of the World | Earth, Wind & Fire | 1975 | 2022 | Dwight E. Brooks | 978-1-5013-7805-8 |
| 169 | Come to My Garden | Minnie Riperton | 1970 | 2022 | Brittnay L. Proctor | 978-1-5013-7915-4 |
| 170 | Fontanelle | Babes in Toyland | 1992 | 2022 | Selena Chambers | 978-1-5013-7755-6 |
| 171 | Madvillainy | Madvillain | 2004 | 2023 | Will Hagle | 978-1-5013-8923-8 |
| 172 | Come Away with ESG | ESG | 1983 | 2023 | Cheri Percy | 978-1-5013-7919-2 |
| 173 | BBC Radiophonic Workshop – A Retrospective | BBC Radiophonic Workshop | 2008 | 2023 | William Weir | 978-1-5013-8915-3 |
| 174 | Time's Up | Living Colour | 1990 | 2023 | Kimberly Mack | 978-1-5013-7751-8 |
| 175 | Beauty and the Beat | The Go-Go's | 1981 | 2023 | Lisa Whittington-Hill | 978-1-5013-9028-9 |
| 176 | Erotica | Madonna | 1992 | 2023 | Michael Dango | 978-1-5013-8899-6 |
| 177 | Body Count | Body Count | 1992 | 2023 | Ben Apatoff | 978-1-5013-8907-8 |
| 178 | Ingénue | k.d. lang | 1992 | 2023 | Joanna McNaney Stein | 978-1-5013-8919-1 |
| 179 | Here's Little Richard | Little Richard | 1957 | 2023 | Jordan Bassett | 978-1-5013-8911-5 |
| 180 | Invasion of Privacy | Cardi B | 2018 | 2024 | Ma’Chell M. Duma | 978-1-5013-8927-6 |
| 181 | This Is Hardcore | Pulp | 1998 | 2024 | Jane Savidge | 979-8-7651-0695-2 |
| 182 | Sandinista! | The Clash | 1980 | 2024 | Micajah Henley | 978-1-5013-9036-4 |
| 183 | 101 | Depeche Mode | 1989 | 2024 | Mary Valle | 978-1-5013-9032-6 |
| 184 | 3 + 3 | The Isley Brothers | 1973 | 2024 | Darell M. McNeill | 979-8-7651-0671-6 |
| 185 | Red Hot + Blue | Various artists | 1990 | 2024 | John Garrison | 979-8-7651-0663-1 |
| 186 | White Limozeen | Dolly Parton | 1989 | 2024 | Steacy Easton | 978-1-5013-9040-1 |
| 187 | Garth Brooks in... the Life of Chris Gaines | Garth Brooks/Chris Gaines | 1999 | 2024 | Stephen Deusner | 979-8-7651-0687-7 |
| 188 | Hounds of Love | Kate Bush | 1985 | 2024 | Leah Kardos | 979-8-7651-0699-0 |
| 189 | The Moon & Antarctica | Modest Mouse | 2000 | 2024 | Zachary Petit | 979-8-7651-0675-4 |
| 190 | Paris 1919 | John Cale | 1973 | 2025 | Mark Doyle | 979-8-7651-0679-2 |
| 191 | Universal Mother | Sinead O'Connor | 1994 | 2025 | Adele Bertei | 979-8-7651-0691-4 |
| 192 | And Then Nothing Turned Itself Inside-Out | Yo La Tengo | 2000 | 2025 | Elliott Simpson | 979-8-7651-0667-9 |
| 193 | The Land of Rape and Honey | Ministry | 1988 | 2025 | Jason Pettigrew | 979-8-7651-0683-9 |
| 194 | Blue Bell Knoll | Cocteau Twins | 1988 | 2025 | Chris Tapley | 978-1-5013-9044-9 |
| 195 | New Amerykah Part Two (Return of the Ankh) | Erykah Badu | 2010 | 2025 | Kameryn Alexa Carter | 979-8-7651-0646-4 |
| 196 | Cosmic Thing | The B-52s | 1989 | 2025 | Pete Crighton | 979-8-7651-3312-5 |
| 197 | Re | Café Tacvba | 1994 | 2025 | Carmelo Esterrich | 979-8-7651-0655-6 |
| 198 | Carrie & Lowell | Sufjan Stevens | 2015 | 2025 | Joel Mayward | 979-8-7651-3276-0 |
| 199 | Antics | Interpol | 2004 | 2026 | Gabriel Saxton-Ruiz | 979-8-7651-3270-8 |
| 200 | Inflammable Material | Stiff Little Fingers | 1979 | 2026 | Kevin Dunn | 979-8-7651-3326-2 |
| 201 | So Tonight That I Might See | Mazzy Star | 1993 | 2026 | Anthony Gomez III | 979-8-7651-3357-6 |
| 202 | Violent Femmes | Violent Femmes | 1983 | 2026 | Nic Brown | 979-8-7651-3351-4 |
| TBC | Blonde | Frank Ocean | 2016 | 2026 | Yousef Srour | TBC |
| TBC | Disintegration | The Cure | 1989 | 2026 | Andi Harriman | TBC |
| TBC | Believe | Cher | 1998 | 2026 | Lior Phillips | TBC |
| TBC | Plastic Beach | Gorillaz | 2010 | 2026 | Ihor Junyk | TBC |
| TBC | What's the 411? | Mary J. Blige | 1992 | 2026 | Ricky Tucker | TBC |
| TBC | Lyburnum Wits End Liberation Fly | Moss Icon | 1993 | 2026 | Zak Fusciello | TBC |
| TBC | "Weird Al" Yankovic in 3-D | "Weird Al" Yankovic | 1984 | 2026 | Justin Remer | TBC |
| TBC | I'm Your Baby Tonight | Whitney Houston | 1990 | 2026 | Brandon Tensley | TBC |
| TBC | Dust Bowl Ballads | Woody Guthrie | 1940 | 2026 | Allison Meier | TBC |

=== 33⅓ Japan ===
| # | Work | Artist | Year (album) | Year (book) | Author of book | ISBN # |
|---|---|---|---|---|---|---|
| 1 | Supercell | Supercell | 2009 | 2017 | Keisuke Yamada | 978-1-5013-2597-7 |
| 2 | Cowboy Bebop Soundtrack | Yoko Kanno | 1998 | 2017 | Rose Bridges | 978-1-5013-2585-4 |
| 3 | Game | Perfume | 2008 | 2018 | Patrick St. Michel | 978-1-5013-2590-8 |
| 4 | AKB48 | AKB48 | N/A | 2019 | Patrick W. Galbraith; Jason G. Karlin | 978-1-5013-4111-3 |
| 5 | Fantasma | Cornelius | 1997 | 2019 | Martin Roberts | 978-1-5013-3017-9 |
| 6 | Joe Hisaishi's Soundtrack for My Neighbor Totoro | Joe Hisaishi | 1988 | 2020 | Kunio Hara | 978-1-5013-4512-8 |
| 7 | Happy Hour | Shonen Knife | 1998 | 2021 | Brooke McCorkle Okazaki | 978-1-5013-4795-5 |
| 8 | Koza Dabasa | Nenes | 1994 | 2021 | Henry Johnson | 978-1-5013-5124-2 |
| 9 | The 14th Moon (ja:14番目の月) | Yuming | 1976 | 2022 | Lasse Lehtonen | 978-1-5013-4571-5 |
| 10 | Kogun | Toshiko Akiyoshi – Lew Tabackin Big Band | 1974 | 2024 | E. Taylor Atkins | 979-8-7651-0901-4 |
| 11 | Don't Be Swindle | S.O.B. | 1987 | 2025 | Mahon Murphy; Ran Zwigenberg | 979-8-7651-0896-3 |

=== 33⅓ Brazil ===
| # | Work | Artist | Year (album) | Year (book) | Author of book | ISBN # |
|---|---|---|---|---|---|---|
| 1 | A Foreign Sound | Caetano Veloso | 2004 | 2017 | Barbara Browning | 978-1-5013-1923-5 |
| 2 | Getz/Gilberto | Stan Getz and João Gilberto | 1964 | 2018 | Bryan Daniel | 978-1-5013-2395-9 |
| 3 | Tim Maia Racional Vols. 1 & 2 | Tim Maia | 1974 | 2018 | Allen Thayer | 978-1-5013-2153-5 |
| 4 | Sorriso Negro | Dona Ivone Lara | 1981 | 2019 | Mila Burns | 978-1-5013-2449-9 |
| 5 | Refazenda | Gilberto Gil | 1975 | 2020 | Marc A. Hertzman | 978-1-5013-3040-7 |
| 6 | Clube da Esquina | Milton Nascimento and Lô Borges | 1972 | 2020 | Jonathon Grasse | 978-1-5013-4682-8 |
| 7 | Sobrevivendo no Inferno | Racionais MC's | 1997 | 2021 | Derek Pardue | 978-1-5013-3887-8 |
| 8 | Saudades | Naná Vasconcelos | 1979 | 2021 | Daniel B. Sharp | 978-1-5013-4570-8 |
| 9 | Chico Buarque | Chico Buarque | 1978 | 2022 | Charles A. Perrone | 978-1-5013-7978-9 |

=== 33⅓ Europe ===
| # | Work | Artist | Year (album) | Year (book) | Author of book | ISBN # |
|---|---|---|---|---|---|---|
| 1 | A Blaze in the Northern Sky | Darkthrone | 1992 | 2020 | Ross Hagen | 978-1-5013-5433-5 |
| 2 | Balkanology | Ivo Papazov | 1991 | 2021 | Carol Silverman | 978-1-5013-4630-9 |
| 3 | Wolokolamsker Chaussee | Heiner Müller and Heiner Goebbels | 1989 | 2021 | Philip V. Bohlman | 978-1-5013-4615-6 |
| 4 | Don't Break the Oath | Mercyful Fate | 1984 | 2022 | Henrik Marstal | 978-1-5013-5437-3 |
| 5 | Niemen Enigmatic | Czesław Niemen | 1970 | 2022 | Ewa Mazierska; Mariusz Gradowski | 978-1-5013-7266-7 |
| 6 | DJs Do Guetto | Various artists | 2006 | 2022 | Richard Elliott | 978-1-5013-5785-5 |
| 7 | Happy Birthday! | Modeselektor | 2007 | 2022 | Sean Nye | 978-1-5013-4624-8 |
| 8 | I'll Be Your Plaything | Bea Palya | 2010 | 2022 | Anna Szemere; András Rónai | 978-1-5013-5444-1 |
| 9 | Sin Documentos | Los Rodríguez | 1993 | 2022 | Héctor Fouce; Fernán del Val | 978-1-5013-5788-6 |
| 10 | Astaganaga | Massada | 1978 | 2022 | Lutgard Mutsaers | 978-1-5013-7257-5 |
| 11 | Bella Ciao | Il Nuovo Canzoniere Italiano | 1976 | 2023 | Jacopo Tomatis | 978-1-5013-7261-2 |
| 12 | Récital 1961 | Édith Piaf | 1961 | 2023 | David L. Looseley | 978-1-5013-6210-1 |
| 13 | Persepolis | Iannis Xenakis | 1971 | 2023 | Aram Yardumian | 978-1-5013-8150-8 |
| 14 | Tantsi | Vopli Vidopliassova | 1989 | 2023 | Maria Sonevytsky | 978-1-5013-6311-5 |
| 15 | Amália at the Olympia | Amália Rodrigues | 1957 | 2023 | Lila Ellen Gray | 978-1-5013-4619-4 |
| 16 | Projekt Jon | Ardit Gjebrea | 1997 | 2024 | Nicholas Tochka | 978-1-5013-6306-1 |
| 17 | Aquarium | Aqua | 1997 | 2024 | C.C. McKee | 978-1-5013-8418-9 |
| 18 | Kollaps | Einstürzende Neubauten | 1981 | 2024 | Melle Jan Kromhout; Jan Nieuwenhuis | 978-1-5013-8750-0 |
| 19 | To the Cold Land | J.M.K.E. | 1989 | 2025 | Brigitta Davidjants | 979-8-7651-0311-1 |
| 20 | Jarmark | Taco Hemingway | 2020 | 2025 | Kamila Raymajdo | 979-8-7651-0306-7 |

=== 33⅓ Oceania ===
| # | Album | Artist | Year (album) | Year (book) | Author of book | ISBN # |
|---|---|---|---|---|---|---|
| 1 | Whispering Jack | John Farnham | 1986 | 2022 | Graeme Turner | 978-1-5013-8206-2 |
| 2 | Starfish | The Church | 1988 | 2022 | Chris Gibson | 978-1-5013-8700-5 |
| 3 | Unit | Regurgitator | 1997 | 2022 | Lachlan Goold; Lauren Istvandity | 978-1-5013-8176-8 |
| 4 | Kylie | Kylie Minogue | 1988 | 2023 | Adrian Renzo; Liz Giuffre | 978-1-5013-8297-0 |
| 5 | Space Waltz | Alastair Riddell | 1975 | 2023 | Ian Chapman | 978-1-5013-8951-1 |
| 6 | Human Frailty | Hunters & Collectors | 1986 | 2023 | Jon Stratton | 978-1-5013-9784-4 |
| 7 | Drive | Bic Runga | 1997 | 2023 | Henry Johnson | 978-1-5013-9003-6 |
| 8 | Songs from the Front Lawn | The Front Lawn | 1989 | 2023 | Matthew Bannister | 978-1-5013-9009-8 |
| 9 | Clyma est mort | The Dead C | 1992 | 2023 | Darren Jorgensen | 978-1-5013-8696-1 |
| 10 | The Calling | Hilltop Hoods | 2003 | 2023 | Dianne Rodger | 978-1-5013-9267-2 |
| 11 | Honey Steel's Gold | Ed Kuepper | 1991 | 2023 | John Encarnação | 978-1-5013-7334-3 |
| 12 | Toward the Blues | Chain | 1971 | 2023 | Peter Beilharz | 978-1-5013-9014-2 |
| 13 | Kitten Licks | Screamfeeder | 1996 | 2024 | Ben Green; Ian Rogers | 978-1-5013-9329-7 |
| 14 | Soundtrack from Saturday Night Fever | Bee Gees | 1977 | 2024 | Clinton Walker | 979-8-7651-0968-7 |
| 15 | The Lord of the Rings, Vols. 1–3 | John Sangster | 1975–77 | 2025 | Bruce Johnson | 979-8-7651-2112-2 |
| 16 | Since I Left You | The Avalanches | 2000 | 2025 | Charles Fairchild | 979-8-7651-1551-0 |
| 17 | Boodle Boodle Boodle | The Clean | 1981 | 2025 | Geoff Stahl | 979-8-7651-1551-0 |
| 18 | Machiavelli and the Four Seasons | TISM | 1995 | 2025 | Tyler Jenke | 979-8-7651-1411-7 |
| 19 | Buy Now | Eyeliner | 2015 | 2025 | Michael Brown | 978-1-5013-9499-7 |
| 20 | Together Alone | Crowded House | 1993 | 2025 | Barnaby Smith | 979-8-7651-0515-3 |
| 21 | Frogstomp | Silverchair | 1995 | 2025 | Jay Daniel Thompson | 979-8-7651-1334-9 |
| 22 | Truckload of Sky: The Lost Songs of David McComb, Vol. 1 | Various | 2020 | 2025 | Glenn D'Cruz | 979-8-7651-2746-9 |
| 23 | Danger in the Past | Robert Forster | 1990 | 2025 | Patrick Chapman | 979-8-7651-2807-7 |
| 24 | Currents | Tame Impala | 2015 | 2026 | Alister Newstead | 979-8-7651-3701-7 |

=== 33⅓ South Asia ===
| # | Album | Artist | Year (album) | Year (book) | Author of book | ISBN # |
|---|---|---|---|---|---|---|
| 1 | Dil Chahta Hai Soundtrack | Shankar–Ehsaan–Loy | 2001 | 2025 | Jayson Beaster-Jones | 978-1-5013-8866-8 |
| 2 | Lata Mangeshkar: My Favourites, Vol. 2 | Lata Mangeshkar | 1988 | 2025 | Anirudha Bhattacharjee; Chandrashekhar Rao | 979-8-7651-0780-5 |
| 3 | Coke Studio (Season 14) | Coke Studio Pakistan | 2022 | 2025 | Rakae Rehman Jamil; Khadjia Muzaffar | 979-8-7651-0014-1 |

=== 33⅓ Africa ===
| # | Album | Artist | Year (album) | Year (book) | Author of book | ISBN # |
|---|---|---|---|---|---|---|
| 1 | Sorrow Tears and Blood | Fela Kuti | 1977 | 2025 | Stephanie Shonekan | 979-8-7651-1309-7 |

=== Anthologies ===
| # | Title | Year | Editor of book | ISBN # |
|---|---|---|---|---|
| 1 | 33 1/3 Greatest Hits, Volume 1 | 2006 | David Baker | 978-0-8264-1903-3 |
| 2 | 33 1/3 Greatest Hits, Volume 2 | 2007 | David Baker | 978-0-8264-2876-9 |
| 3 | The 33 1/3 B-Sides | 2019 | Will Stockton; D. Gilson | 978-1-5013-4245-5 |

=== Genre: A 33⅓ Series ===
| # | Genre | Year | Author of book | ISBN # |
|---|---|---|---|---|
| 1 | Trip hop | 2022 | R.J. Wheaton | 978-1-5013-7360-2 |
| 2 | Death metal | 2022 | T Coles | 978-1-5013-8101-0 |
| 3 | Dance-punk | 2023 | Larissa Wodtke | 978-1-5013-8186-7 |
| 4 | South African Popular Music | 2023 | Lior Phillips | 978-1-5013-8342-7 |
| 5 | Krautrock | 2023 | Marshall Gu | 979-8-7651-0329-6 |
| 6 | '70s Teen Pop | 2023 | Lucretia Tye Jasmine | 978-1-5013-8350-2 |
| 7 | Math Rock | 2024 | Jeff Gomez | 979-8-7651-0337-1 |
| 8 | Neue Deutsche Welle | 2024 | Claudia Lonkin | 979-8-7651-0337-1 |
| 9 | Soul-folk | 2024 | Ashawnta Jackson | 979-8-7651-0345-6 |
| 10 | Shoegaze | 2024 | Ryan Pinkard | 979-8-7651-0341-8 |
| 11 | 1970s Jazz Fusion | 2025 | Matthew Reed Baker | 979-8-7651-1952-5 |
| 12 | Tropicália | 2025 | Ana Leorne | 979-8-7651-1906-8 |
| 13 | 20th Century Ambient | 2025 | Dusty Henry | 979-8-7651-1933-4 |
| 14 | Plunderphonics | 2025 | Matthew Blackwell | 979-8-7651-1948-8 |

== Forthcoming titles ==
=== Main series ===
With release date

- Disintegration (September 3, 2026) by Andi Harriman, on the album by The Cure (1989)
- Plastic Beach (September 3, 2026) by Ihor Junyk, on the album by Gorillaz (2010)
- I'm Your Baby Tonight (October 1, 2026) by Brandon Tensley, on the album by Whitney Houston (1990)
- "Weird Al" Yankovic in 3-D (October 1, 2026) by Justin Remer, on the album by "Weird Al" Yankovic (1984)
- Dust Bowl Ballads (October 15, 2026) by Allison C. Meier, on the album by Woody Guthrie (1940)

Without release date

- Tragic Kingdom by Rhae Lynn Barnes, on the album by No Doubt (1995)
- I'm Wide Awake, It's Morning by Holden Seidlitz, on the album by Bright Eyes (2005)
- What's the 411? by Ricky Tucker, on the album by Mary J. Blige (1992)
- Lyburnum Wits End Liberation Fly by Zak Fusciello, on the album by Moss Icon (1994)
- I Want You by Derrais Carter, on the album by Marvin Gaye (1976)
- Timeless by Martyn Deykers, on the album by Goldie (1995)
- Tin Drum by Agata Pyzik, on the album by Japan (1981)
- Nightbirds by Craig Seymour, on the album by Labelle (1974)
- Shout at the Devil by Micco Caporale, on the album by Mötley Crüe (1983)
- Return to the 36 Chambers: The Dirty Version by Jarett Kobek, on the album by Ol' Dirty Bastard (1995)

=== 33⅓ Japan ===
- Kōhaku utagassen: The Red and White Song Contest by Shelley Brunt (January 8, 2026)
- Yellow Magic Orchestra (delayed) by Toshiyuki Ohwada, on the album by Yellow Magic Orchestra (1978)

=== 33⅓ Europe ===
- 1964/1985 Affinità-divergenze fra il compagno Togliatti e noi – Del conseguimento della maggiore età (January 8, 2026) by Giacomo Botta, on the album by CCCP (1986)
- Februar (January 8, 2026), on the album by Silly (1989)
- Phaedra (delayed) by Dan Bynre-Smith, on the album by Tangerine Dream (1974)

=== 33⅓ Oceania ===
- Currents (January 8, 2026) by Alister Newstead, on the album by Tame Impala (2015)
- The Happy Prince (June 11, 2026) by John Tebbutt, on the album by The La De Das (1969)

=== 33⅓ Africa ===
- Graceland (August 6, 2026) by Kalvin Schmidt-Rimpler Dinh, on the album by Paul Simon (1986)

=== Genre: A 33⅓ Series ===
- Minimalist Music (April 2, 2026) by George Grella, Jr.
- Pub Rock (June 11, 2026) by George Grella, Jr.
- Queercore (June 11, 2026) by Audrey Golden
- Vaporwave (delayed) by Kirk Walker Graves

== See also ==
- Boss Fight Books – a publisher that releases an eponymous series about notable video games
