= The Very Best of Men's Recovery Project =

Greatest hits album by Men's Recovery Project
- Released: October 15, 2005
- Genre: experimental, punk
- Length: 61:15
- Label: 5RC; Load Records (2LP)

Men's Recovery Project chronology
Night Pirate (2001)	The Very Best of Men's Recovery Project (2005)

Professional ratings
Review scores
Source	Rating
Scene Point Blank	8.8/10 link
Semtex Magazine	8/10 link
Splendid Magazine	favourable link

The Very Best of Men's Recovery Project is a greatest hits album released by the American experimental punk group Men's Recovery Project on October 15, 2005 (see 2005 in music). The album was released on CD on the 5RC label, while Load Records released the vinyl edition.

In addition to core band members Sam McPheeters and Neil Burke, the album features appearances from former members Kathleen Hanna (Le Tigre/Kill Rock Stars), bassist Joe Preston (Thrones; also the namesake of one of the album's tracks), and members of The Locust, Rah Bras, The Chinese Stars and Six Finger Satellite.

== Track listing ==
1. "700 Story Building" – 1:44
2. "Cacti" – 1:36
3. "Stubble On The Chin Of A Vicious Brute" – 2:14
4. "Bleeding Gash" – 1:21
5. "Sexual Pervert" – 0:59
6. "Frank & Judy" – 1:53
7. "Occoquah" – 0:49
8. "Smokable Birth Control" – 1:28
9. "In Khartoum" – 2:12
10. "How Long Have You Lived In This House?" – 2:08
11. "Fresh Frankness" – 0:47
12. "Problem?" – 0:32
13. "Remove Dead Birds" – 2:10
14. "Portuguese Princess" – 0:31
15. "Egyptian Assassin" – 3:02
16. "Normal Man" – 2:26
17. "Why We Are Lazy" – 2:29
18. "Man Urinating, Laughter" – 0:25
19. "Vote Fraud On The Moon Base" – 0:59
20. "The Mayor Is A Robot" – 0:52
21. "Men's Recovery Project" – 1:18
22. "Get The Fuck Out Of My Office" – 0:40
23. "Get Your Dick Out Of My Food" – 1:48
24. "Homo?" – 0:26
25. "Resist The New Way" – 1:27
26. "Million Man March" – 0:57
27. "Clark In My Car" – 1:12
28. "The Couch" – 2:39
29. "You Pay Attention To Me, Not Vice Versa" – 1:49
30. "Manhole" – 1:42
31. "Remove Pants" – 0:23
32. "Joe Preston" – 0:31
33. "Captured Danish Photographer" – 0:30
34. "Boums To Zanzibar" – 1:53
35. "Thaw Walt" – 0:27
36. "They Found My Naked Body By The River" – 2:08
37. "New Talking Sausage" – 2:20
38. "Avoid Pregnancy During Alcohol" – 2:52
39. "The Awful People In The Empty City" – 3:53
40. "Frank Talk" – 1:43
