= Neil Burke =

- Born: November 22, 1968 (age 57); Newton, New Jersey, U.S.
- Genres: Punk rock; Hardcore punk; Indie rock; Noise rock; Experimental rock
- Occupations: Musician, Artist, Graphic Designer, Screenprinter
- Instruments: Vocals; Guitar; Harmonica; Keyboards; Drum Machine
- Years active: 1986–present
- Labels: Vermiform; Lungcast; Kill Rock Stars; Load Records
- Website: www.monoroid.com

Neil Burke is an American musician and artist. He is known as a former member of several hardcore punk and noise rock bands, most notably Born Against and Men's Recovery Project. Burke is currently a musician, poster artist, graphic designer and screen printer working out of Philadelphia, Pennsylvania.

Burke also ran Lungcast Records, a sporadically active independent record label.

== Musical career ==
Burke began his career as a bassist in punk rock bands in the New Jersey and New York City areas. After playing with the group Dead Fist, Burke formed Life's Blood, who played a politicized form of New York hardcore. Life's Blood was extant from 1987–1989. Although he co-founded the follow-up band Born Against with guitarist Adam Nathanson, he left early in its career, appearing only on its demo cassette and first compilation track. Burke next joined the short-lived indie rock group Menace Dement, playing bass on their debut EP and posthumous album.

In 1993, Burke relocated to Richmond, Virginia, with Nathanson and Born Against vocalist Sam McPheeters. He played in the first lineup of Nathanson's folk punk group (Young) Pioneers, but appeared only on the group's debut EP. Around this time, he and McPheeters co-founded Men's Recovery Project, an experimental noise rock band, who released several albums and toured extensively over the next ten years before disbanding. Burke also embarked on a solo project called Sinking Body, which played its own brand of brash noise rock.

== Work as artist ==
In addition to playing on many of its recordings, Burke did extensive graphic design work for Sam McPheeters' Vermiform Records and helped create the label's distinct look. His work with Monoroid, the design and printing company he runs, continues in this stylistic direction. Neil has designed many album covers aside from Men's Recovery Project and Sinking Body. Some bands include Hail Mary, Amps for Christ and The Locust.

In 2007, one of his prints was chosen for the 81st Annual International Competition: Printmaking, at The Print Center in Philadelphia. His work has been exhibited worldwide in many group and solo shows.

He is currently designing record covers, graphic tees and posters for bands and creating illustrations for various magazines when not working on his own music and art.
