= Brooks Headley =

American musician and chef

- Genres: Punk rock, hardcore punk, indie rock, folk punk, emo
- Instruments: Drums, percussion
- Years active: 1992–present
- Labels: Vermiform Records, Lookout! Records, Kill Rock Stars

Brooks Headley is an American musician and chef, best known as the drummer in several hardcore punk and indie rock bands.

Headley was the executive pastry chef at Del Posto, a New York Times-rated four-star restaurant, in New York City. He left Del Posto to open a vegetarian burger restaurant, Superiority Burger.

== Musical career ==
Headley played drums in the Baltimore-area hardcore band fifth column in the early 90s, with guitarist Dave Dagdigian before going on to join/emo band Universal Order of Armageddon from 1992 to 1994. With Universal Order of Armageddon bandmate Tonie Joy, he also joined the final lineup of the political hardcore band Born Against in 1993.

Later that year, he moved to Richmond, Virginia, and co-founded the group (Young) Pioneers, with whom he remained for several years. Through the remainder of the 1990s, he had brief stints in Men's Recovery Project and The Great Unraveling, followed by more extended time in Skull Kontrol and Wrangler Brutes.

Headley has formed the band Oldest with guitarist Mick Barr of Orthrelm. Additionally, he is active with Universal Order of Armageddon, who again began performing in 2010.

== Personal life ==
In 1999, Headley earned a bachelor's degree from the University of Maryland, where he was a member of the Golden Key National Honor Society.

In May 2013, Headley won the prestigious "Outstanding Pastry Chef" from the James Beard Foundation for his work at the New York restaurant, Del Posto. In 2019, Headley was nominated for the James Beard Foundation Award "Best Chef: New York City" for Superiority Burger.
