= Men's Recovery Project =

American rock band

- Origin: Richmond, Virginia, U.S.
- Genres: Experimental rock, noise rock
- Years active: 1993–2002
- Labels: Kill Rock Stars, Vermiform, Load
- Past members: Sam McPheeters; Neil Burke; Grant Mudge; B. Rah; Steve Moniker; Max Henkel; Adam Nathanson; Brooks Headley; Tonie Joy; Joe Preston; John Michaels; Isabellarah Rubella; Jean Rah
- Website: Official website

Men's Recovery Project was an American experimental noise rock band formed by Sam McPheeters and Neil Burke in Richmond, Virginia, active from 1993–2002. The group's post-modern absurdist musical attitude resulted in a diverse and consistently obtuse output, with varied material touching on electronic, avant garde, comedy and spoken word motifs that often alluded to their roots in hardcore punk.

== History ==
Burke (formerly of the New York hardcore band Life's Blood) and McPheeters originally co-founded the hardcore punk band Born Against in 1989, although Burke left the group later that year. The group's message slowly gave way to cynical absurdism over their four-year career, and Men's Recovery Project, founded in 1993 after the demise of Born Against, further developed these sensibilities.

The duo of McPheeters and Burke remained Men's Recovery Project's core members, although the group was frequently augmented by additional musicians. Over its career, the band saw membership from Joe Preston (of The Melvins and Thrones), Tonie Joy (of Moss Icon and Universal Order of Armageddon), producer Max Henkel, and the entirety of the group Rah Bras, among others. The band toured the US extensively, and also made two trips to Japan.

Men's Recovery Project released four full-length albums and numerous smaller releases on labels such as Kill Rock Stars, Lungcast Records and McPheeters' own Vermiform Records. Following their demise, McPheeters formed the short-lived hardcore band Wrangler Brutes. Burke is involved in art and screen-printing.

== Discography ==
- "Emergency Record" 7" (Lungcast, 1993)
- "Make a Baby" 7" (Vermiform, 1994)
- "Frank Talk About Humans" CD/7"x2 (Vinyl Communications, 1994)
- "Normal Man" 7" (Gravity, 1995)
- "Time to Milk" 7" split w/ H.G.C. (Chester, 1996)
- "Botanica Mysteria" 7" (Kill Rock Stars, 1996)
- "Immense Ovary Reject" 7" (Walkabout, 1996)
- "New Human" tour-only 5" (Vermiform, 1996)
- "Thank You for Killing Me" 7" (Paralogy, 1997)
- The Golden Triumph of Naked Hostility CD (Vermiform, 1997)
- Grappling with the Homonids [sic] LP/CD split with Sinking Body (Vermiform, 1998)
- Resist the New Way LP/CD (Vermiform, 1999)
- Bolides Over Basra LP/CD (Load, 2000)
- Night Pirate LP/CD (Kill Rock Stars, 2001)
- The Very Best of Men's Recovery Project (5RC, 2005)
