= Wrangler Brutes =

American hardcore punk band

- Origin: Los Angeles, California, USA
- Genres: Hardcore punk
- Years active: 2003–2004
- Label: Kill Rock Stars
- Past members: Sam McPheeters; Andy Coronado; Cundo Si Murad; Brooks Headley
- Website: Official site

The Wrangler Brutes were an American hardcore punk band formed in 2003 in Los Angeles, California.

== History ==
Wrangler Brutes were formed around vocalist Sam McPheeters (ex-Born Against, Men's Recovery Project), drummer Brooks Headley (ex-Born Against, Universal Order of Armageddon, (Young) Pioneers), guitarist Andy Coronado (of Skull Kontrol, Monorchid, Nazti Skinz, Glass Candy) and bassist Cundo Si Murad. The band sold over 1,000 copies of their self-released, self-titled cassette in nine months. This release was followed by a 7" record and a full-length LP, Zulu, recorded in May 2004 with Steve Albini. The album featured Chris Thomson (of Monorchid and Circus Lupus fame), as well as Circle Jerks' Keith Morris on vocals. The band recorded their October 8, 2004, show at Monkey Mania in Denver, Colorado, with Permanent Record Studios. The concept was to release a "bootlegged" live version of their Zulu album, but due to the band's split, the live CD was never released. However, a limited-run cassette-only version of the ZULU Live "Bootleg" recording was released on January 21, 2017, by 25 Diamonds Label. In December 2004, at the end of a lengthy Japanese tour, McPheeters bowed out and was replaced for the band's last US show by Dean Spunt of the bands Wives and No Age.

The band was known for somewhat confrontational and hectic live performances which were heralded by their biggest fans as a return to the artsy yet entertaining briskness of early-Los Angeles hardcore punk. McPheeters' sense of humor dominated their presence as a live act; his patter, alternately caustic and cryptic, was a major aspect of these shows. On their first tour, their set ended with noted history buff McPheeters donning a wig and reciting a dramatic monologue taken from the closing scene of act 1 of Shakespeare's Henry V.

McPheeters also penned an over-the-top dismissal of Zulu for the OC Weekly under the name "Walter Burgerns," an anagram of the band's name.

== Band members ==
- Sam McPheeters - vocals
- Andy Coronado - guitar
- Cundo Si Murad - bass
- Brooks Headley - drums

== Discography ==
- 1 sided 7" (WBR, 2003)
- 16-song cassette (WBR, 2003)
- Zulu LP / CD (WBR / Kill Rock Stars, 2004)
- Zulu "Bootleg" CD - Live from Monkey Mania - Denver, CO (Unreleased, 2004)
- 16 Song Cassette Revisited LP (X-Mist, 2005)
- 16 Song Cassette Revisited, Again 8"x 2 (Clarence Thomas, 2005)
- Denver 10/08/04 Cassette (25 Diamonds Label, 2017) (cassette version of Zulu "Bootleg" CD - Live from Monkey Mania - Denver, CO)
