= Bob Tilton (band) =

English post-hardcore band

- Origin: Arnold, Nottinghamshire, U.K.
- Genres: Emo; post-rock; post-hardcore; math rock
- Years active: 1993–1999
- Labels: Subjection, Southern, Sousaphon, Genet, Armed with Anger
- Spinoffs: Wolves Of Greece
- Spinoff of: Downfall
- Past members: Neil Johnson; Mark Simms; Simon Fern; Allan Gainey; Chay Lawrence; Ralph Hamilton

Bob Tilton were an English post-hardcore band, from Arnold, Nottinghamshire. Formed in 1993 by former members of Downfall, the band helped to establish the mid-1990s UK emo scene alongside Liverpool band Dead Wrong. Following the release of their debut EP Wake Me When It's Springtime Again (1993), the band gained attention of the mainstream music producers, magazines and labels, however the band refused to interact with the industry. Their debut album Crescent was released in 1996, its fusion of emo and post-rock becaming a reference point for many subsequent post-rock groups. Following the album's release, the band became less active, as the band's member spread across England for university, disbanding in 1999. Their final album, The Leading Hotels Of The World (2000), was released posthumously.

== History ==
=== 1993: Formation and Nothing New ===
Bob Tilton formed in 1993 in Arnold, Nottinghamshire by guitarist Neil Johnson and bassist Mark Simms alongside former Downfall vocalist Simon Fern and drummer Allan Gainey. Their first show was in March 1993, opening for Revolution Summer band Christ on a Crutch, alongside Nottingham punk band Slum Gang. When Fern and Johnson were organising this show, the band was named Static, however he had created the poster using an image of American televangelist Robert Tilton. Before the show took place, a friend suggested the band derived their name from Tilton, due to Fern's interest in religious imagery and his opposition to the capitalisation of Christianity.

In their early days they perform frequently alongside Liverpool band Dead Wrong, who later called them "our best friends in the scene." This led to the 1993 EP Nothing New, which featured Dead Wrong, Bob Tilton, Kitchener, Bugeyed and Kito, released through Armed with Anger Records.

=== 1994–1995: Introduction of Chay Lawrence, Wake Me When It’s Springtime Again and Songs Of Penknife And Pocketwatch ===
While attending a Quicksand show, the band hired Chay Lawrence, guitarist for Holbeach emo band Tribute, to play second guitar. Lawrence departed from the band soon after due to his relocation to London to attend university. During a show at Bradford's the 1 in 12 Club, the band were approached by Ian Simpson, owner of Subjugation Records, who booked them studio time with Andy Sneap on 2 January 1994. Lawrence dropped out of university three weeks later and returned to Nottinghamshire, however did not inform the members of Bob Tilton, feeling embarrassed at his perceived academic failure. Soon, Lawrence attended a Bob Tilton show, where Johnson approached him, asked him if he'd moved back and whether he'd like to rejoined the band. Lawrence accepted. Subjugation released the band's debut EP Wake Me When It’s Springtime Again later that year. The EP and the band's live performances were instantly successful in the underground. Around this time they were being courted by music executive Seymour Stein and record producer Rick Rubin. The same year, they released a split EP with Cowboy Killers and Billy Rubin, released through First Strike Records, and contributed a track to the Subjugation Records EP with Dead Wrong, Tribute and the French screamo band Fingerprint.

In March 1995, the band released their second EP Songs Of Penknife And Pocketwatch, which they promoted with a headline tour of the United Kingdom and mainland Europe, with support from Fabric. They embarked on a second tour of mainland Europe in June, playing four dates in Sweden, in addition to Munster and Belgium. That same year, they recorded a Peel Session for BBC Radio 1, and played the first Camden Crawl festival with Kenickie and Quickspace.

=== 1996–1997: Crescent ===
Their debut album Crescent (1996) was recorded with instruments tracked in Johnson's parents living room, and vocals in a disused flat in Lenton. A 1996 article by NME noted them as having gained a "new-found indie stardom". The band began to be active in both the northern England hardcore punk scene and the southern England indie rock scene, a fact that led to backlash from the hardcore scene. Around this time, the band began to expand throughout England, with Simms relocating to Leeds for university, and Lawrence moving frequently. They were booked to perform at the Bedford Esquires in May 1997 with Mogwai, but did not show up.

=== 1998–2000: Disbandment and The Leading Hotels Of The World ===
In 1998, they recorded their follow up album, over the course of a total of two weeks spread over a year, largely in the basement of Simms' house in Leeds. They performed at the January 1999 NME Awards alongside Mogwai, Bonnie Prince Billy and Clinic, and soon released an instrumental split EP with Beligan emo band Reiziger. That year, Southern Records re-released Crescent, gaining the band significant attention outside of the hardcore scene. Chay Lawrence soon departed from the group to attend Central Saint Martins. His role being filled by Ralph Hamilton from Useful Idiot. The band's output slowed significantly at this time.

They announced their imminent disbandment in April 1999, following the departure of Gainey. They were offered a spot supporting Fugazi and the Jesus Lizard at the Brixton Academy, however declined, wishing the exposure to go to a newer band. Instead, in Spring 1999, Bob Tilton played their final show at Bunkers Hill Inn in Nottingham supporting Ligament and Lazarus Clamp. The 1998 recording was released as their second album The Leading Hotels Of The World in 2000, featuring a softer sound. It was released through Sousaphon Recordings, an imprint of Southern Records that was established specifically for this record.

Following their disbandment, Fern and Johnson formed the band Wolves of Greece.

== Musical style and legacy ==
Critics have categorised their music as emo math rock and post-hardcore. A number of publications coined the term "scrunchcore" to describe them, referencing Fern's tendency to scrunch himself into a corner while performing, a term which CMJ New Music Monthly writer Lois Maffeo called "a precursor of the 'emo' label to describe emotionally driven punk". Other publications noted them as "emo kings". NME referred to their debut album Crescent as "arty post-rock emocore". The Leading Hotels of the World saw a stylistic shift to indie emo. Bandcamp Daily writer Simon Czerwinskyj noted them as and "hyper-emotional punk".

The band's style was chaotic, incorporated elements of noise music, and used amplifier feedback. A 1994 review in Overall There Is A Smell of Fried Onions magazine called them "the piss poor man's version of Youth of Today". Their songs were largely written by Johnson.

They cited influences including Moss Icon, the Nation of Ulysses, Heroin and Born Against, with Simms also taking elements of indie rock.

=== Legacy ===
AllMusic writer Stephen Cramer retrospectively noted the band as "certainly influential in the transformation of the new elegant form of punk: emo". They have been cited as an influence by Blood Red Shoes, Kagoule, Hookworms and David Gamage of Rydell, Joeyfat and the Couch Potatoes. In his memoir, Stuart Braithwaite cited Bob Tilton as one of the motivations for his band Eska to sign to Love Train Records, and called Fern "the most intense singers I'd ever seen, truly a force of nature." Chris Leo of the Van Pelt called the band their "brothers in arms" and that they "made sure we linked up with that crew on our first UK tour in 1997".

Kerrang! listed them as one of "20 bands who didn’t get the respect they deserved".

While a band, they did not allow their labels to send out review copies and did not partake in interviews, despite this, their single "Penknife and Pocketwatch" was awarded Single Of The Week by the NME.

== Members ==
- Neil Johnson – guitar (1993–1999)
- Mark Simms – bass (1993–1999)
- Simon Fern – vocals (1993–1999)
- Allan Gainey – drums (1993–1999)
- Chay Lawrence – guitar (1994; 1995–1998)
- Ralph Hamilton – guitar (1998–1999)

== Discography ==
Albums

- Crescent (1996)
- The Leading Hotels Of The World (1999)

EPs

- Nothing New (1993, split EP with Dead Wrong, Kitchener, Bugeyed and Kito
- ...Wake Me When It's Springtime Again (1994)
- Songs Of Penknife And Pocket Watch (1995)
- Bob Tilton / Reiziger (1999, split EP with Reiziger)
