= Vermin Scum =

American record label

- Founder: Kenny Hill
- Distributor: Spastic Rats
- Country of origin: United States

Vermin Scum is an Annapolis, Maryland-based record label founded by Kenny Hill (1965–2020) of the bands Spastic Rats and the Hated. The name was given to fit the theme of the label's first release, the Spastic Rats' "Rodentia."

Released recordings by bands such as Spastic Rats, the Hated, Moss Icon, and The Shit. Later run by Tonie Joy of the band Moss Icon, who is sometimes cited (incorrectly) as the founder of the label; Currently not active. There is some controversy over Joy's takeover of the label; members of the Hated have stated repeatedly that the label was "stolen".

== Discography ==
- 1. Spastic Rats – Rodentia 7” (1985)
- 2. The Hated – No More We Cry 7” (1985)
- 3. Moss Icon – Hate in Me 7” (Dancing Song #1) (1988)
- 4. and 5. The Hated – Like the Days 2x 7” (1987)
- 6. The Hated – Everysong 12” (1989)
- 7. Moss Icon – Mahpiua Luta 7” (Dancing Song #2) (1989)
- 8. Choke – Kingdom of Mattresses 7” (Simple Machines 0.5) (1990)
- 9. Breathing Walker – Breathing Walker cassette/12”/CD (1990/2000)
- 9. Phido – Phido 7” (Tarantula Seed Records) (1990)
- 9. The Fifth Column – Pullman 7” (1991)
- 10. Moss Icon – Memorial 7” (black) (clear) (1991)
- 11. Moss Icon/Silver Bearing split 12” (1991)
- 12. The Hated – What Was Behind 12” (1992)
- 13. Freak Beans – Nurture the Seed 7” (1991)
- 14. The Shit – The Shit 12”
- 15. Sleeping Body – Awaken 7” (1992)
- 16. Universal Order of Armageddon – City 7” (black) (clear) (1993)
- ?17.
- ?17.5 The Hassassins – Fury III 7” (Activated Hick Wunderkin Power) (1994) (no catalog # printed or etched on vinyl, but someone told me 17.5)
- 18. Blank – Piotrville b/w Guillotine Lullaby 7” (black) (white)
- 18.5 Blank – Tab Street Affair CD (2% Muscle)
- 19. The Great Unraveling – The Angel Rang Virtue 7” (black) (clear w/ white /100)
- 20. Moss Icon – It Disappears (Ebullition) (black) (grey marble) (1995)
- 21. Behind Closed Doors – Self-Titled 12” (1997)
- 22. Black Dice – Black Dice 7”
- 23. The French Mistake – The French Mistake 7” (1998)
- 24. Charm City Suicides – Charm City Suicides 12” (2001)
- ?25.
- 26. Glass Candy – Smashed Candy 12" (2001)

== Releases without known catalog numbers ==
- v/a – Crabtowne Comp Cassette + stapled, xeroxed zine (credited to "Vermin Scum Tape 02", c. 1985)
- Azazello’s Cream “Mucus Theory” Cassette
- Blank, self-titled cassette (1992)
- Lava “Demo” Cassette
- Maheesh, self-titled cassette (1992, featuring ex-members of Love Slug and Azazello's Cream)
- Three Shades of Dirty “Paper Roses/Demo" Cassette
- Trainwreck “Self-Titled” Cassette
- Universal Order of Armaggedon "Demo" Cassette

== Distributed by Vermin Scum Records ==
- Onespot Fringehead "Wish" 7" (Gadfly) (1992)
- The Hassassins – Solar Lottery 12-inch 45 rpm (Activated Hick Wunderkin Power)(1994)
- The Hassassins – The Hassassins Crash! 10-inch EP (Activated Hick Wunderkin Power)(1996)
