= The Convocation =

American psychedelic rock band

- Also known as: The Convocation Of...
- Origin: Baltimore, Maryland, United States
- Genres: Hard rock, psychedelic rock
- Years active: 1998–2002, 2005–present
- Labels: Gold Standard Laboratories, Tiger Style Records, Gravity Records
- Members: Tonie Joy; George France; Donny Van Zant
- Past members: Guy Blakeslee; Matthew Hall; Jason Stevens; Chris Camden

The Convocation (formerly The Convocation Of...) is an American psychedelic rock band from Baltimore, Maryland.

== History ==
As The Convocation Of..., the band was formed by George France, Tonie Joy, and Guy Blakeslee in August 1998. Joy had previously played in the groups Moss Icon, Universal Order of Armageddon, The Great Unraveling, and Born Against.

Following their debut Lab Remix Series Vol. 3 EP, the group's self-titled debut album was released on Gold Standard Laboratories in 2000. A follow-up, Pyramid Technology, appeared on Tigerstyle Records in 2001. In early 2002, Blakeslee left the group and founded The Entrance Band. The Convocation Of... went on a hiatus.

With Matthew Hall (formerly of The Red Scare) on bass, the band reunited under the name The Convocation in 2005. Hall was replaced by Jason Stevens in 2008, and the group released a new EP on Gravity Records the next year. Two years later, Stevens was replaced by bassist Chris Camden, who was replaced thereafter by Donny Van Zandt.

== Members ==
Current members

- Tonie Joy – guitar, vocals (1998–2002, 2005–present)
- George France – drums (1998–2002, 2005–present)
- Donny Van Zant – bass (2011–present)

Former members

- Guy Blakeslee – bass (1998–2002)
- Matthew Hall – bass (2005–2008)
- Jason Stevens – bass (2008–2009)
- Chris Camden – bass (2010)

== Discography ==
Albums

- The Convocation Of... (Gold Standard Laboratories, 2000)
- Pyramid Technology (Tigerstyle Records, 2001)

EPs

- Lab Remix Series Vol. 3 (Gold Standard Laboratories, 2000)
- The Convocation (Gravity Records, 2009)

Splits

- The Convocation/Chrissakes (Trans Ruin Records / One Percent Press, 2010)
