= Superiority Burger =

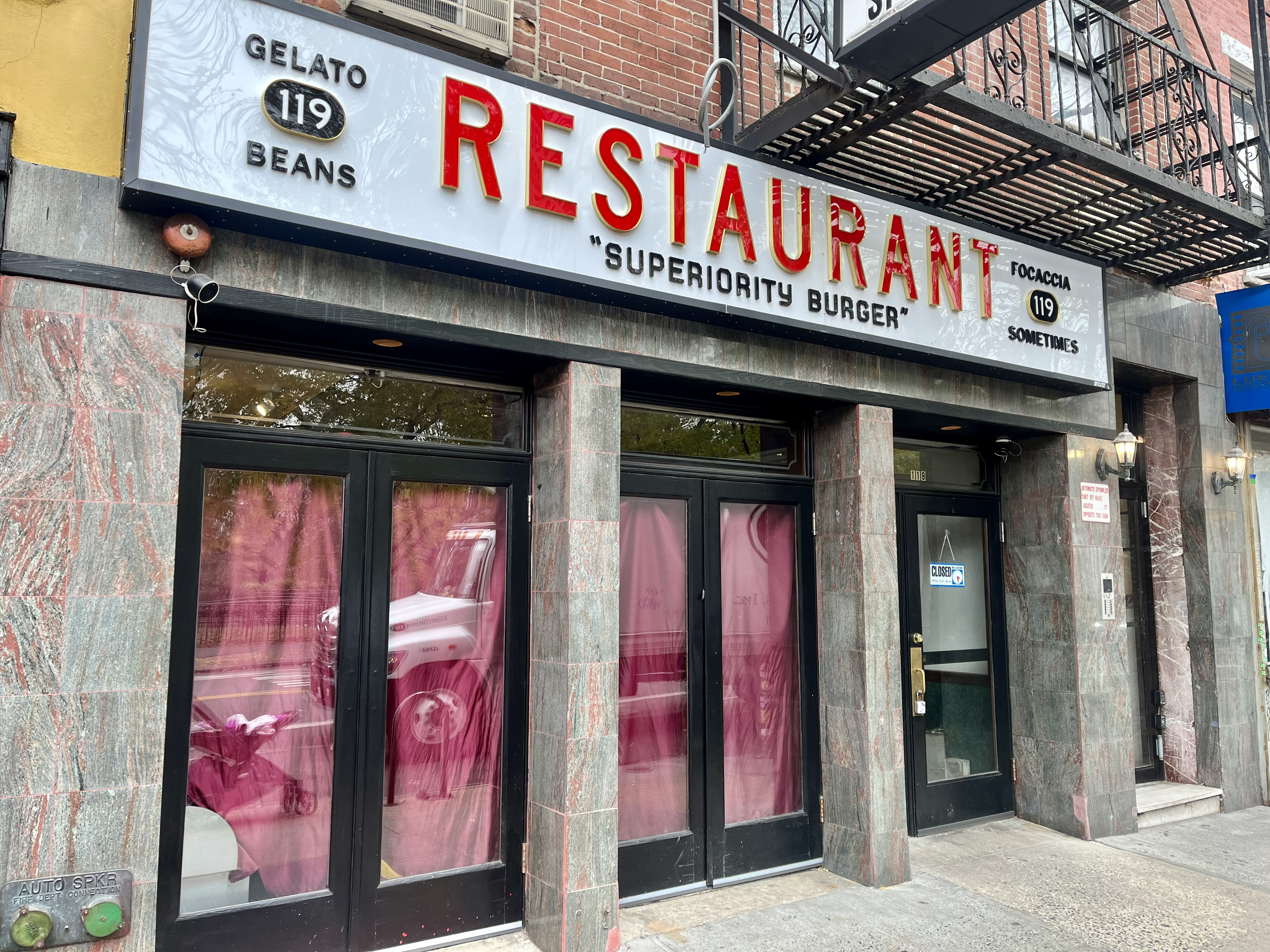
- Superiority Burger in December 2023
- Interactive map of Superiority Burger

Restaurant information
- Established: 2015
- Location: 119 Avenue A, New York City, New York, 10009, United States
- Coordinates: 40°43′35.3″N 73°59′0.5″W
- Website: superiorityburger.com

Superiority Burger is a vegetarian burger restaurant located in the East Village neighborhood of New York City. The restaurant opened in its first location in 2015, and was closed from late 2021 until early 2023, at which point it opened in a second, larger location.

== History ==
Superiority Burger was founded by Brooks Headley and opened in June 2015. The vegetarian restaurant Dirt Candy was previously the tenant of Superiority Burger's original location. Headley has said the restaurant outgrew its original location "pretty much on the day we opened". In the summer of 2021, Headley announced he had signed a lease to take over the space formerly occupied by Odessa, a diner. The diner operated in the space for 26 years, and closed due to a decrease in traffic caused by the COVID-19 pandemic. Headley hand-delivered letters to the closed restaurant after failing to contact its owners through other means. The operators of the diner also own the building which housed it, and sought a new tenant with "strong roots in the community". Before the space became available, Headley considered it his "dream space" for Superiority Burger due to its size and pre-existing build out.

The restaurant closed in its original location in November 2021. At the time of the closure, Headley said the new space would be ready in February or March 2022. However, the restaurant ultimately reopened in the space formerly occupied by Odessa in April 2023. The new location has a full bar. Superiority Burger briefly offered a "late-night" menu in the new location, but stopped serving it after several nights to better serve those eating at the restaurant during the day. The restaurant added a lunch service in 2024.

Another Superiority Burger opened in Tokyo in 2019. The Tokyo location offers some of the same dishes as the New York location and some foods unique to Japan.

== Menu and offerings ==
As the restaurant serves its vegetarian burger daily, the staff can make them in bulk. The burger's ingredients include carrot, quinoa, chickpeas, and caramelized onions. The restaurant sources ingredients from the Union Square Greenmarket.

The restaurant introduced a lunch menu in 2024. The lunch menu includes items not found at other times, including a grilled cheese and french fries.

== Reviews and accolades ==
=== Reviews ===
==== Original location ====
Pete Wells, in a review of the original location published by The New York Times, awarded the restaurant two of four stars. He praised the yuba cheesesteak as "an honest variation" on the Philadelphia cheesesteak.

Writing for Observer, Joshua David Stein compared the restaurant's burger favorably to the chicken sandwich served by Fuku, a restaurant run by David Chang.

==== New location ====
In a review of the restaurant's new location published by The New Yorker, Hannah Goldfield expressed apprehension about the restaurant's drink prices, but praised the affordability of the restaurant's food, especially considering its quality. Goldfield praised several dishes, originally served at the restaurant's first location, as "still wonderful".

In June 2023, Pete Wells reviewed Superiority Burger for a second time after its move to the new location. Wells reviewed the burger positively, writing that it "...seems better now than it was in 2015. Wells also praised the restaurant as "more engaging and alive than some restaurants that cost many times as much". He awarded the restaurant three out of four possible stars.

=== Accolades ===
Tejal Rao included the restaurant's "Philadelphia Yuba" on her list of the "18 Best Dishes in New York" in 2015. In an article published by Bloomberg compiling the world's best burgers as chosen by those connected to the food and dining industry, chef Enrique Olvera chose the restaurant's burger as his favorite. Actress Cate Blanchett has referred to the restaurant's burger as "the thinking man's burger". Nikita Richardson, in an article published by the New York Times discussing vegetarian restaurants in New York City, referred to the restaurant's veggie burger as "one of the best...in the city".

In 2019, Headley was nominated for the James Beard Foundation Award "Best Chef: New York City" for Superiority Burger. The business was a semifinalist in the Outstanding Restaurant category in 2024. The New York Times included the restaurant on its 2023 year-end list of restaurants that "most excited" the paper's staff. Pete Wells placed Superiority Burger in eighth place in his 2024 ranking of the best hundred restaurants in New York City.
