= Lyburnum Wits End Liberation Fly =

1993 album by Moss Icon

Studio album by Moss Icon
- Released: 1993
- Recorded: 1988
- Genres: Emo; post-hardcore
- Length: 42:48
- Label: Vermiform

Lyburnum Wits End Liberation Fly is the sole full-length album by American post-hardcore band Moss Icon.

The album was recorded in 1988, and released in 1993 on Vermiform Records. The band broke up in between the recording and release, in 1991.

It was included in Gimme Indie Rock: 500 Essential American Underground Rock Albums 1981–1996 and is the subject of a forthcoming entry in the 33⅓ series.

Writing about the record, Andrew Earles says the band's "important sound" is "distinguished by the prodigious and unhindered guitar vision" of Tonie Joy. Other hallmarks include "vocals that are sometimes stream-of-consciousness spoken and sung, and sometimes furiously screamed", plus "unpredictable and explosively dynamic soft-to-loud shifts".

== Recording ==
Lyburnum Wites End Liberation Fly was recorded over three separate sessions. The album, like most other Moss Icon releases, was initially done with singer Jonathan Vance in a vocal booth separate from the rest of the band. However, Vance insisted on re-recording several of the songs live, with all members in the same room, resulting in the vocals on many of the tracks sounding, according to Joy, "buried" in the mix.

== Track listing ==
All lyrics are written by Jonathan Vance; all music is composed by Moss Icon.

No.	Title	Length
1.	"Mirror"	2:17
2.	"I'm Back Sleeping or Fucking or Something"	3:09
3.	"The Life"	2:44
4.	"Divinity Cove"	4:56
5.	"Locket"	4:33
6.	"Kick the Can"	2:49
7.	"Lyburnum Wits End Liberation Fly"	11:23
8.	"Cricketty Rise (Haverton Roads - Browns and Greens)"	1:40
9.	"As Afterwards the Words Still Ring"	3:53
10.	"Happy (Unbounded Glory)"	5:19
Total length:		42:50

== Personnel ==
- Moss Icon - music
- Jonathan Vance - vocals, lyrics
- Tonie Joy - guitar
- Monica Digialleonardo - bass, artwork
- Mark Laurence - drums
- Les Lentz - recording engineer
- Tony French - mixing
- Chris Bald - artwork
