= Tonie Joy =

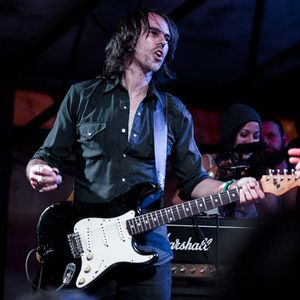

Background information
- Born: Anthony R. Joy
- Origin: Baltimore, Maryland
- Genres: Hard rock, psychedelic rock, post-hardcore, punk rock
- Instruments: Guitar, vocals, bass
- Years active: 1986–present
- Labels: Kill Rock Stars, Gravity, Gold Standard Laboratories, Vermiform, Ebullition, Vermin Scum

Anthony R. "Tonie" Joy is an American musician based in Baltimore, Maryland. Joy is known for his work in various underground rock and post-hardcore bands. He ran the independent record label Vermin Scum from 1989 until 2001. He emerged in the late 1980s and has been a key figure in several notable bands.

Joy is perhaps best known for his role in Moss Icon, a band that played a significant part in the development of the post-hardcore and emo scenes with their complex song structures and introspective lyrics. Moss Icon's music, especially their album Lyburnum Wits End Liberation Fly, has been highly influential in shaping the sound of later emo and post-hardcore bands.

Apart from Moss Icon, Joy has been involved with other bands, including Breathing Walker, an offshoot of Moss Icon, Universal Order of Armageddon (UOA), The Convocation, and Born Against. Each of these projects has contributed uniquely to various sub-genres of punk and hardcore, with UOA being notable for their intense, chaotic sound and The Convocation Of... blending post-rock and experimental elements.

Throughout his career, Joy has been appreciated for his innovative guitar work and his ability to blend intensity with emotion in his music. His contributions have left a lasting impact on the alternative and punk music landscapes.

== Musical career ==
=== Early Influences ===
Having been inspired by his father Bill's early '70s acid rock band Grok and previous group The Verdicts, Joy began playing music as a teenager. Joy got his first guitar when he was 15 years old. He met up with his father at a guitar store, and they split the cost of the guitar - with his father paying half as a Christmas present. This was the first time Joy was able to start seriously learning and playing guitar.

Joy had a diverse range of early musical influences starting from a young age. He was drawn to the loud, distorted sounds of 1970s hard rock and metal bands that his parents and older cousin, who loaned him records by Joy Division and Throbbing Gristle. He listened to, such as Deep Purple, Black Sabbath, and Led Zeppelin, as well as psychedelic rock from the late 1960s (bands like Jefferson Airplane). As the 1970s progressed, he began gravitating towards more experimental and avant-garde music. In the late 1970s and early 1980s, he was exposed to punk rock and gained an appreciation for bands in the emerging hardcore scene like Minor Threat. Joy also listened to new wave and post-punk acts like Siouxsie and the Banshees. Throughout his teenage years, Joy remained open-minded with his tastes, enjoying a variety of styles including psychedelic rock, metal, and any "weird" or unique music. These diverse influences from his early life helped inform the unconventional sound that Joy and Moss Icon would go on to create in the 1980s DC underground scene.

=== Moss Icon (1986 - 1991) ===
In 1986 he co-founded Moss Icon which is known as an early influence on the hardcore punk rock splinter genre known as "emotive hardcore" or emo. Tonie Joy has said that seeing The Hated play for the first time inspired he and Jonathan Vance to start Moss Icon, saying, "“I remember thinking, ‘This is like hardcore thrash meets Richie Havens.’ How were they strumming so fast?” Joy says. “I think that night jump-started the idea of us doing a band.” Moss Icon were active until 1991, briefly in 2001, and occasionally since 2007. Joy recalls: "The folks in Moss Icon, we were between 16 and 18," Joy said ..., "all in middle class and upper-middle class suburbia outside of Annapolis. I lived with my grandmother, which made me a little different than most of my friends. I was never much of a child. I thought the Black Panthers were cool when I was, like, 10." In 1990 Joy played guitar in Breathing Walker, a band containing members of Moss Icon as well as other musicians.

=== Post-Moss Icon (1991 - 1995) ===
Shortly thereafter, following a brief period playing guitar in and contributing artwork to Lava, Joy co-founded Universal Order of Armageddon, another influential post-hardcore group. During this time Joy served as the bassist in the final lineup of the political hardcore band Born Against. Joy's first appearance as a front man came in 1995 with The Great Unraveling, a band formed by members of Universal Order of Armageddon. Joy was also an occasional member of the group Men's Recovery Project in the late 1990s.

=== Universal Order of Armageddon (1992 - 1994) ===
The band was known for its intense, chaotic performances and a sound that blended elements of punk, hardcore, and experimental rock. Universal Order of Armageddon's music was marked by frantic energy, complex structures, and a raw, aggressive sound. Their performances were often unpredictable and highly energetic, contributing to their reputation in the underground music scene. They released a self-titled EP, a full-length album, and several singles. The band's influence, especially marked by Joy's distinctive style of guitar work, extended beyond their brief existence, impacting many subsequent post-hardcore and punk bands.

=== The Convocation (1998 - present) ===
After Universal Order of Armageddon's dissolution in 1997, Joy co-founded The Convocation Of..., who, despite a period of inactivity from 2002–2005, currently remain active under the name The Convocation. It was formed in 1998 by Joy and drummer George France. They were later joined by bassist Guy Blakeslee of The Entrance Band. The band's sound is characterized by a mix of post-hardcore, experimental rock, and psychedelic influences. Their music often features intricate guitar work, dynamic rhythms, and a blend of melodic and dissonant elements. The Convocation is known for its atmospheric and expansive soundscapes, distinguishing them within the post-hardcore scene.

=== 2010 - present ===
In 2010 he briefly played bass in the hard rock band The Pilgrim and in 2011 played guitar on a few tracks on the Cold Cave LP Cherish the Light Years and was a touring guitarist on their 2011 UK and EU tour. Later this year, Joy debuted his 7 piece live band called Slow Bull, the culmination of several years of solo writing and recording efforts. Joy currently is in band called Rogue Conjurer Joy also in 2024 contributed guitar tracks to the forthcoming record "Learning to Live with Fire" by Caithlin de Marrais, the singer and bassist for Rainer Maria. As of 2025, Joy is in a new band called Deep Essence with former bandmate Randy Davis, also from The Great Unraveling. Their first EP was released on March 14, 2025.

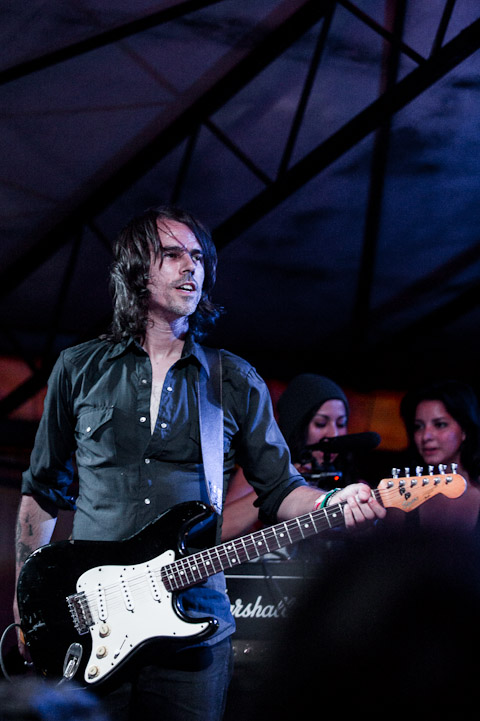

== Equipment ==
When asked why he preferred Fenders and single coils over Gibsons and humbuckers, Joy explained that Strats felt more comfortable and he appreciated working within their limitations. He also admired Ritchie Blackmore, who used Strats.

== Signature sound ==
Tonie Joy’s guitar style is a blend of aggressive punk energy, experimental creativity, and complex rhythms, all delivered with a raw and authentic DIY spirit.

Tonie Joy’s approach is marked by a raw and aggressive sound, typical of the post-hardcore genre. His playing often features heavy distortion and a gritty tone, which contributes to the intense atmosphere of his music.

Joy incorporates experimental elements into his guitar work, utilizing unconventional chord structures and dissonance. This experimentation adds an atmospheric and sometimes chaotic feel to the music, setting it apart from more traditional punk and hardcore styles

He frequently employs various effects pedals to create a wide range of sounds, from reverb and delay to more flanger and phaser. This contributes to the expansive and layered textures in his music

His playing often features complex rhythms and time signatures, which adds to the unpredictability and excitement of the music. This complexity is a hallmark of his work with bands like Universal Order of Armageddon and The Convocation

Influenced by the DIY ethic of the hardcore punk scene, Joy’s style also reflects a hands-on, unpolished approach that emphasizes authenticity and emotional expression over technical perfection

His playing has been characterised by listeners as deeply emotive, conveying a sense of urgency and passion. This emotional intensity is a key aspect of his contribution to the development of the emo and post-hardcore genres.
