= Life's Blood =

American hardcore punk band

- Origin: New York City, United States
- Genres: Hardcore punk
- Years active: 1987–1989
- Labels: Combined Effort, Vermiform, Blackout, Urban Style, Prank
- Past members: Jason O'Toole; Adam Nathanson; Neil Burke; John Kriksciun

Life's Blood was an American hardcore punk band formed by four first-year college students in New York City in 1987. It consisted of Adam Nathanson on guitars, Neil Burke on bass, John Kriksciun on drums, and Combined Effort all ages shows promoter and fanzine editor Jason O'Toole on vocals.

They were part of the scene associated with CBGB's Sunday matinees and Some Records. Life's Blood gained a loyal following for their aggressive sound that blended East Coast hardcore-punk with melodic Oi!, as well as their intelligent lyrics. Life's Blood played live on WNYU and WFMU, and played 26 shows throughout New York, New Jersey, Connecticut and Ohio.

Life's Blood performed alongside acts including Sheer Terror, Beyond, Judge, Project X, and Soulside before breaking up in 1989. Nathanson would go on to form Born Against with Sam McPheeters on vocals. Kriksciun went on to play drums for Collapse and Burn, among other acts. Burke, an artist who works in visual and audio mediums, played in Born Against, Sinking Body and Men's Recovery Project. In 1992, O'Toole performed and recorded with Factory in a lineup including past and future members of Intent, Hail Mary, Brown Cuts Neighbors and Limp Wrist.

In 2011, O'Toole sang for My Rifle on a self-titled EP backed by former members of Our Gang, Hell No, and Absolution, on Wardance Records. This may be the only punk record to receive a glowing review from Maximumrocknroll despite the vocalist's 20 years in law enforcement.

Life's Blood's songs have been covered live and on recordings by bands from Sweden and Japan as well as American hardcore acts. A notable cover of "It's Not in Your Heart" by MK-ULTRA appeared on the Teen Angst compilation. Finland's Down My Throat covered "Youth Enrage" on their album Real Heroes Die.

Among Life's Blood's recordings are Defiance, originally on Combined Effort, the Vermiform Records compilation EP Murders Among Us, the New York Hardcore compilation Where the Wild Things Are on Blackout Records, the New Breed compilation, a split 7-inch with Sticks And Stones, as well as a rash of bootlegs. Vermiform released a CD containing the original "Defiance" ep along with extra material.

Prank Records is releasing the complete Life's Blood discography in early 2016.
