= Econochrist =

American hardcore punk band

- Origin: Little Rock, Arkansas; Oakland, California
- Genres: Hardcore punk
- Years active: 1988–1993
- Labels: Ebullition Records; Truant Records; Insurrection Records; Vermiform Records; Very Small Records
- Past members: Ben Sizemore; Markley Hart; Jon Sumrall; Andy Branton

Econochrist was an American political hardcore punk band active in the late 1980s and early 1990s. They moved from Arkansas to the San Francisco Bay Area to become part of the punk music scene there. The group was composed of singer Ben Sizemore, aka Ben Econochrist, drummer Markley Hart, guitarist Jon Sumrall, and bassist Mike Scott.

== Discography ==
- It Runs Deep 7" (1988, Truant Records)
- Ruination LP (1990, Very Small Records)
- The Detonators/Econochrist split EP with The Detonators (1991, Insurrection Records)
- Another Victim 7" (1991, Vermiform Records)
- Trained to Serve LP (1992, Vermiform Records)
- Skewed 7" (1993, Ebullition Records)
- Econochrist 2xCD collection of the band's work – (Ebullition Records)

=== Compilation appearances ===
- Bombpop 9" flexi (1990, A Day Late and a Dollar Short Records)
- What Are You Pointing At? 10" (1989, Very Small Records)
- Give Me Back (1991, Ebullition Records)
- Very Small World 2xLP (1991, Very Small Records)
