= Hugo Wilcken =

- Occupation: Novelist
- Writing career
- Genres: Fiction, literary fiction, mystery fiction

Hugo Wilcken is a Paris-based, Australian-born writer and translator. His works focus on themes of existentialism and ambiguity.

== Works ==
=== Fiction ===
- The Reflection, ISBN 9781612194493
- Colony ISBN 9780007106486
- The Execution ISBN 9780060934088

=== Nonfiction ===
- David Bowie's Low (33 1/3) ISBN 9780826416841
