= Mind Pollution (The First Installment) =

Compilation album by Various artists
- Released: 1991
- Genre: Punk rock
- Label: Words of Warning

Mind Pollution (The First Installment) is a various artists compilation album released in 1991 by Words of Warning. The album's sequel Mind Pollution 2 was released in 1993 by the same label and contains a majority of the tracks from this collection.

== Track listing ==
Side one
No.	Title	Artist	Length
1.	"Shit on Me"	Herb Garden
2.	"Burn the Flag"	Suicidal Supermarket Trolleys
3.	"Nightmare of Reality"	Rectify
4.	"Tick Tock"	Cowboy Killers
5.	"We're Dreaming"	Terminus
6.	"New York"	Blaggers ITA
7.	"Planet Death Camp"	Pleasant Valley Children
8.	"Success"	Vampire Rodents

Side two
No.	Title	Artist	Length
1.	"Mirror Mirror"	Hopeful Monsters
2.	"Insanity"	[Resist]
3.	"Americans Out"	Oi Polloi
4.	"Through the Wire"	Lunch Head
5.	"Gay and Proud"	Academy 23
6.	"Fox and Hound"	Four Sons of King Henry V
7.	"Bloody Blue"	Therapy?
8.	"Rave in Resistance"	Internal Autonomy
9.	"Deja Vu"	Random Killing

== Personnel ==
Adapted from the Mind Pollution (The First Installment) liner notes.

== Release history ==
Region	Date	Label	Format	Catalog
United States	1991	Words of Warning	LP	WOWLP11
