= Thrones (band) =

American band

- Origin: Seattle, Washington, U.S.
- Genres: Doom metal, avant-garde music, noise rock, experimental rock
- Years active: 1994–present
- Labels: Kill Rock Stars, Southern Lord, Punk in My Vitamins?
- Members: Joe Preston
- Website: Kill Rock Stars band page

Thrones is the solo project of American bassist Joe Preston.

== Biography ==
Thrones began in 1994 with an untitled cassette on the Punk in My Vitamins? label. He soon released the "Reddleman" single. In 1996, Thrones signed to Communion Records to issue the full-length album Alraune. Thrones then signed to Kill Rock Stars and released the single "The Suckling". In late 1997, Preston began a recording project under the working title "White Rabbit, White Rabbit, White Rabbit". The project was eventually released as two 12 inch EPs; White Rabbit in 1999, followed by Sperm Whale in 2000. Both EPs were compiled in the Sperm Whale CD. In 2005, a compilation of various Thrones material spanning from 1994 to 2001 was released by Southern Lord Records under the title Day Late, Dollar Short.

After an extended hiatus beginning in 2001, Thrones began regularly performing live again in May 2006, although there were sporadic live appearances during this period supporting bands such as Sunn O))). Preston has also performed as part of Sunn O))) using Moog synthesizers and has previously been a member of Earth, The Melvins, Men's Recovery Project, and High on Fire.

Preston typically starts shows by saying something to the effect of "Hi. We're Thrones." even though Thrones is a solo act.

== Discography ==
- Untitled demo cassette (1994 Punk in My Vitamins? Records)
- "Reddleman" 7" (1994 Punk in My Vitamins? Records)
- Alraune CD (1996 The Communion Label)
- "The Suckling" 7" (1998 Kill Rock Stars)
- "Senex" 7" (1999 Soda Girl Records)
- Split 7" with Behead the Prophet, No Lord Shall Live (1999 Voice of the Sky Records)
- White Rabbit 12" EP (1999 Kill Rock Stars)
- Sperm Whale 12" EP (2000 Kill Rock Stars)
- Sperm Whale/White Rabbit CD (2000 Kill Rock Stars)
- Day Late, Dollar Short compilation CD (2005 Southern Lord Records)
- Late for Dinner 7" (2010) Conspiracy Records)
