= Agata Pyzik =

Polish journalist (born 1983)

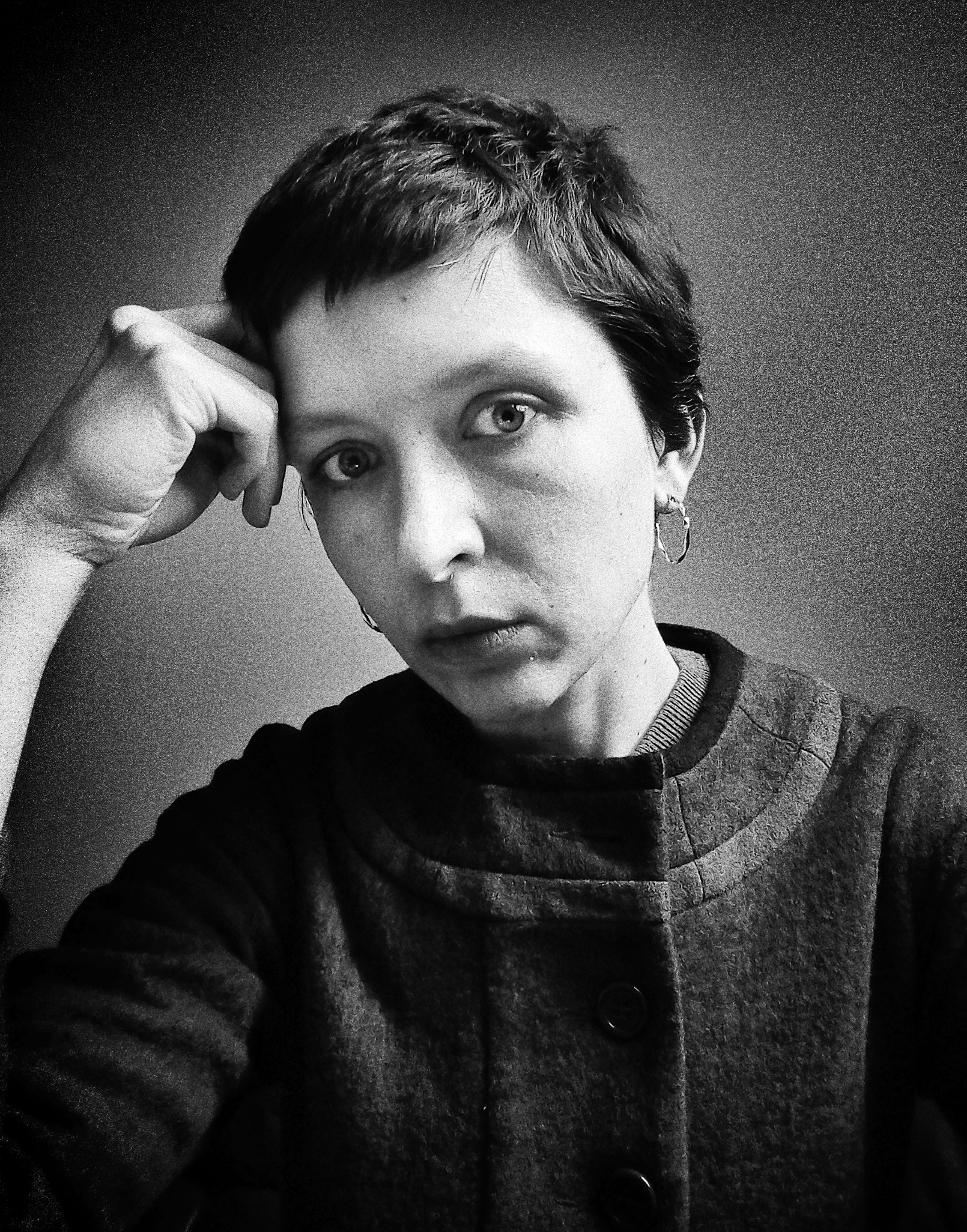
- Pyzik in 2019
- Born: c.1983 (age 42–43); Poland
- Occupations: Journalist, critic
- Writing career
- Notable works: Poor But Sexy: Culture Clashes in Europe East and West (2014)
- Website: nuitssansnuit.blogspot.com

Agata Pyzik (born c. 1983) is a Polish journalist and cultural critic who has written on politics, art, music, and culture. Her 2014 book Poor But Sexy: Culture Clashes in Europe East and West examines the artistic and cultural history of late-20th century Eastern Europe under socialism and its eventual transition to neoliberal capitalism. Her writing has appeared in The Wire, The Guardian, New Statesman, frieze, and New Humanist. She lives in Warsaw.

== Biography ==
Pyzik was born in 1983 in Poland, where she pursued academic studies in philosophy, art history, English, and American studies. She wrote for Polish magazines such as Gazeta Wyborcza, Dziennik, and Polityka, as well as music magazine Glissando and smaller literary magazines. Her recent interests have turned toward political aesthetics and forms of resistance. Her study of Eastern Europe, Poor But Sexy, was published by Zero Books in 2014.

== Reception ==
In a review of Poor But Sexy for The Guardian, Sukhdev Sandhu wrote that

Pyzik wants to reassess the culture of the cold war period, to give the lie to the widely held impression that eastern Europe must have been uniformly dour and artistically sterile, and to explore the heady mixture of fear, desire and yearning that fuelled the imaginative traffic between east and west. [...] Ideas, some more developed than others, tumble from each page creating a kind of swarm energy that's a pleasing antidote to the tasteful mourning found in so many books about eastern Europe. There's an urgency and intensity to Poor But Sexy that's entirely in keeping with Pyzik's assertion that the key cultural feature of pre-1989 Poland was high-mindedness.

Critic Simon Reynolds called the book

a fascinating and provocative study of Eastern Europe (including her native Poland) in the quarter-century since the Soviet Bloc began to disintegrate, looking at both the realities of post-communist life (transition trauma, precarity, emigration for work, etc) and at the fantasies and misunderstandings that East and West entertain about each other, as figured through pop, fashion, film, and art.

== Bibliography ==
- Poor But Sexy: Culture Clashes in Europe East and West. (Zero Books, 2014)
- Dziewczyna i pistolet (Pamoja Press, 2020)
