= Moss Icon =

American post-hardcore band

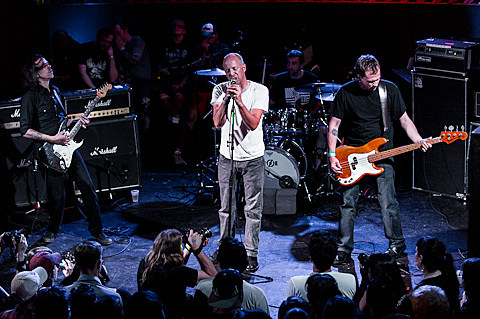
- Moss Icon in 2012. From left to right: Tonie Joy, Jonathan Vance, Zak Fusciello, Alex Badertscher.

Background information
- Origin: Annapolis, Maryland, U.S.
- Genres: Post-hardcore; emo; hardcore punk
- Years active: 1986–1991; 2001; 2007–present
- Labels: Vermiform; Vermin Scum; Ebullition; Temporary Residence Limited
- Members: Jonathan Vance; Tonie Joy; Alex Badertscher; Zak Fusciello
- Past members: Monica DiGialleonardo; Mark Laurence

Moss Icon is an American post-hardcore band from Annapolis, Maryland, formed in late 1986. Its original lineup consisted of vocalist Jonathan Vance, guitarist Tonie Joy, bassist Monica DiGialleonardo, and drummer Mark Laurence. Alex Badertscher joined as the second guitarist in 1990. Moss Icon is considered to be an early influence on the hardcore punk splinter genre known as post-hardcore, as well as on the eventual development of emo. However, the band members themselves have repeatedly denied knowingly contributing to the latter genre in any way.

== History and background ==
=== Formation to breakup ===
Moss Icon's identifying characteristics, and those that distinguished them from their contemporaries, included noticeable and abrupt transitions from loud to quiet, and Jonathan Vance's esoteric stream of conscious lyrical content. Early recordings from the band are reminiscent to that of early Joy Division, while later songs embodied a less blunt approach with more exploratory arrangements and riffage. Vance's lyrics touched upon vaguely, among other issues, the plight of indigenous peoples of the Americas, and opposed the U.S. government's involvement in Nicaragua and Guatemala. Moss Icon performed live frequently with fellow Annapolis band The Hated. The band recorded and released their debut EP, Moss Icon, in January 1988.

Over the course of three different studio sessions in 1988, Moss Icon would record their second EP, Mahpiua Luta, as well as their debut full-length. Guitarist Tonie Joy has stated that the album was eventually "abandoned" because "Jonathan wasn't happy with it or something."

In 1990, a side project of Moss Icon was formed called Breathing Walker, containing all four members of the band plus Alex Badertscher on bass, Zak Fusciello on percussion, and Tim Horner on violin. Breathing Walker released a cassette that was re-released on vinyl and CD in 2001 by the Vermin Scum label, along with live tracks.

Moss Icon's third EP, titled Memorial, was recorded in January 1991 along with a split LP with Silver Bearing. In 1994, Ebullition Records released It Disappears, an LP compiling songs from Memorial with live versions of several other songs.

=== Post-breakup and 2001 reformation ===
Following the dissolution of Moss Icon, guitarist Tonie Joy became a member of various bands, including Universal Order of Armageddon, Born Against, and The Convocation Of.... (later christened The Convocation). During Joy's tenure in Born Against, the band's vocalist Sam McPheeters offered to release Moss Icon's sole full-length on his label Vermiform Records. The album, titled Lyburnum Wits End Liberation Fly, would be posthumously released in 1993, two years after the band's break-up.

Other band members became less involved in music afterwards, except for Laurence's drumming in Lava, DiGialleonardo's Blue Condors, and Vance's solo debut album.

Moss Icon reunited to play two shows with Zak Fusciello on drums, one at the 2001 More Than Music Fest in Columbus, Ohio and the other at the renovated Charles Theatre in Baltimore, Maryland.

=== Recent activity ===
In July 2008, Moss Icon was named one of the "23 Bands Who Shaped Punk" by Alternative Press magazine in issue No. 240. Vance's first officially released book, Tulip Has a Room, was published by Easysubcult.

Since 2007, Joy, Vance, Zak Fusciello, and Alex Badertscher have been occasionally working on new material in Baltimore, Maryland, for a possible new recording. In May 2012, a discography release compiling the band's entire recorded output was released through Temporary Residence Limited, featuring two discs along with photos and lyrics. The band also played a couple of live shows in New York City and Washington, D.C., in December 2014.

In 2023, a 30th anniversary edition of Lyburnum Wits End Liberation Fly was released by Temporary Residence Limited.

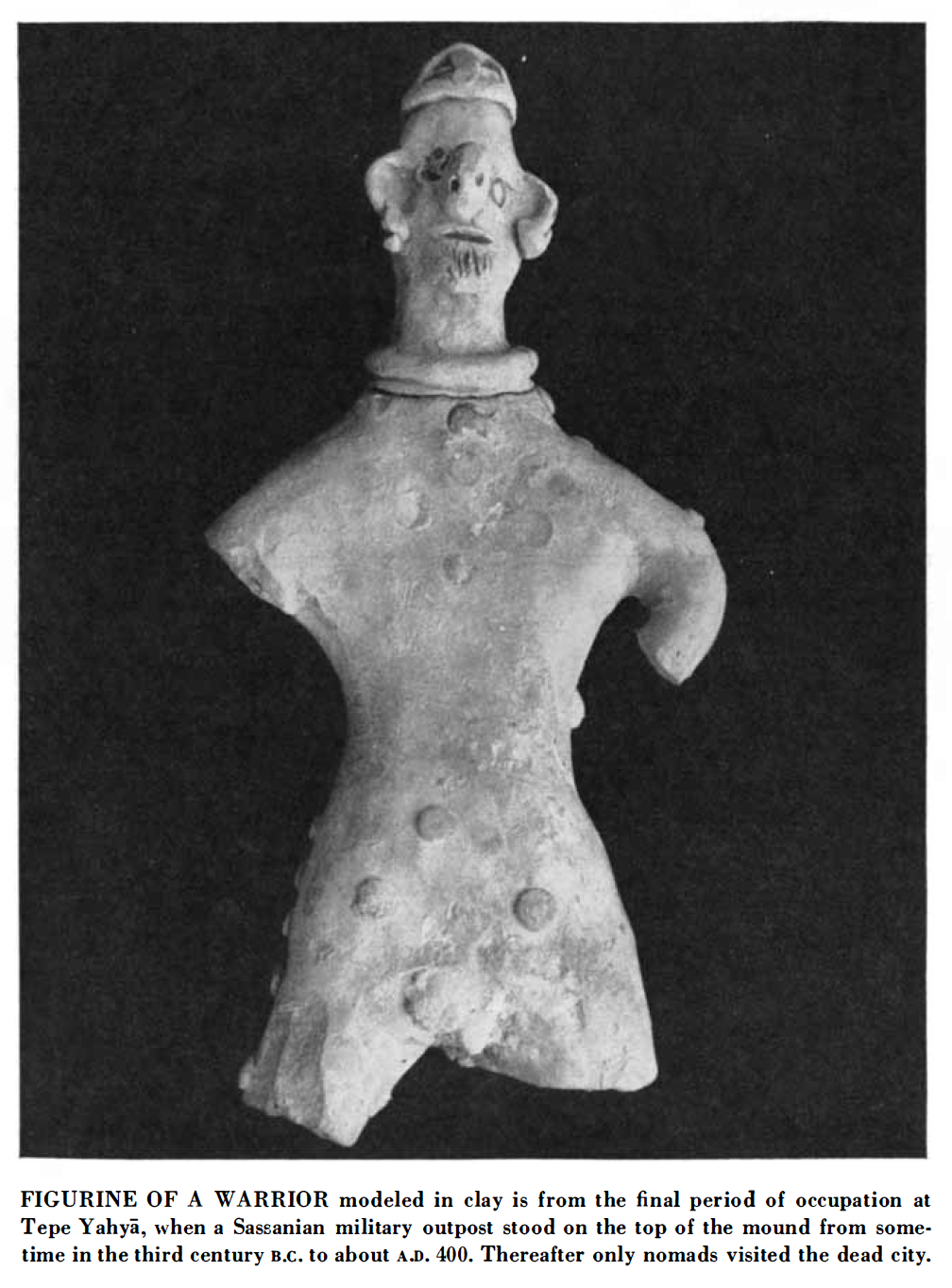
The iconic image for Moss Icon's full-length, Lyburnum Wits End Liberation Fly, a figurine of a Tepe Yahya warrior, modeled in clay.

== Album art ==
Although neither Tonie Joy nor Jonathan Vance recall the specifics of how they discovered the image for their full-length, Lyburnum Wits End Liberation Fly, its origin can be traced to a 1971 Scientific American article, which includes an illustration depicting a "figurine of a warrior modeled in clay from the final period of occupation at Tepe Yahya, when a Sassanian military outpost stood on the top of the mound from sometime in the third century B.C. to about A.D. 400. Thereafter only nomads visited the dead city."

== Discography ==
=== Studio albums ===
- Moss Icon / Silver Bearing (1991, Vermin Scum)
- Lyburnum Wits End Liberation Fly (1993, Vermiform Records)
- It Disappears (1994, Ebullition Records/Vermin Scum)

=== Extended plays ===
- Moss Icon (1988, Vermin Scum/Dancing Song) (Note: This EP is also referred to as Hate in Me)
- Mahpiua Luta (1989, Vermin Scum)
- Memorial (1991, Vermin Scum)

=== Demos ===
- Moss Icon (1987, Self-released)
- The Life Demo (1989, Self-released)

=== Compilation albums ===
- Complete Discography (2012, Temporary Residence Limited)

=== Compilation appearances ===
- Panx Zine No. 3 EP (1988, Panx) - "Mirror"
- Life is Change CD (1991, Bari Beri) - "Guatemala"
- Superpowers cassette (1992, Troubleman Unlimited) - "Sioux Day"
- Powerless II LP (1992) - "Divinity Cove"
- Fear of Smell LP (1993, Vermiform) - "Excerpt From It Disappears"
- False Object Sensor LP/CD (2001, Vermiform, also appears on The Hated's Unreleased Songs bootleg LP) - "Cornflower Blue" (with Daniel Littleton and Michael Littleton of Ida)
