= Vermiform Records =

American independent record label

Vermiform
- Founded: 1990
- Founder: Sam McPheeters
- Defunct: 2002
- Genre: Punk rock
- Country of origin: United States
- Location: Various

Vermiform Records was an American independent record label that specialized in releasing punk rock music from 1990 until 2002. Vermiform released 58 albums and relocated many times, being headquartered in New York, New Jersey, Virginia, Rhode Island and California at different times. The label was run by Sam McPheeters, the singer from Born Against.

== Roster ==
- Amps For Christ
- Bastard Noise
- Born Against
- Bullet in the Head
- Citizens Arrest
- Econochrist
- Fast Forward
- The Great Unraveling
- Hail Mary
- Heroin
- Landed
- Life's Blood
- Manacled
- Man Is The Bastard
- Men's Recovery Project
- Moss Icon
- Mr. Brinkman
- Pleasurehorse
- Rah Bras
- Rorschach
- Screeching Weasel
- Towel
- Witchypoo
- Worst Case Scenario
- (Young) Pioneers

== Releases ==
No.	Year	Artist	Title	Format	Release notes
0	1990	Various Artists	Murders Among Us	7"	Co-release with Combined Effort Records, approximately 2,500 copies pressed.
0.5	1990	Born Against	Eulogy	7"	Two pressings made, 2,500 copies pressed.
1	1990	Born Against	Born Against	7"	Five pressings, 7,090 copies pressed. First pressing had purple and white labels, later pressings had yellow labels with either green or purple text.
2	1991	Rorschach	Remain Sedate	LP, CS	Two pressings of the LP were made, making 2,000 LP copies total. Cassette edition was pressed once, with only 1,000 made.
3	1991	Life's Blood	Defiance	7"	Originally released by Combined Effort Records. The Vermiform edition was pressed four times, making 4,166 copies total. Also released with the catalog number 3CD is the Defiance discography compilation, which was pressed once in 1996 with 2,144 copies made.
4	1991	Menace Dement	Nanna	7"	Co-release with Lungcast Records. Single pressing, 1,000 copies made.
4.5	1991	Rorschach/Neanderthal	Rorschach/Neanderthal	7"	Split 7" between Rorschach and Neanderthal. Pressed twice, approximately 2,500 copies made.
5	1991	Citizens Arrest	Colossus	LP	Co-release with Wardance. One pressing was made of the split label version, with 1,000 copies made. Wardance would repress the record by themselves later.
6	1991	Born Against	9 Patriotic Hymns For Children	LP	Pressed four times, 5,967 copies pressed. The CD edition of the album was released by Vermiform in 1994 with the catalog number 6.5. The CD was pressed four times, the total number of copies being 9,322.
7	1991	Econochrist	Another Victim	7"	Pressed once, 1,000 copies made.
8	1992	The Manacled	The Manacled	7"	Pressed once, 1,000 copies made.
9	1991	Man Is The Bastard	Sum Of The Men: "The Brutality Continues..."	LP	Pressed twice, 4,200 copies pressed total. In 1996, Vermiform issued the album on CD format with bonus tracks, labeling it with the catalog number 9CD. 5,054 CD copies pressed.
10	1992	Econochrist	Trained To Serve	LP	Pressed once, 2,000 copies made.
11	1993	Various Artists	Fear Of Smell	LP	Pressed twice, 2,441 total copies made. Early copies had unique, hand made covers. Later released on CD in 1998 with the catalog number 11CD, 1,900 copies made in a single pressing.
12	1993	Born Against	Battle Hymns Of The Race War	10"	Pressed twice, 5,326 copies made.
13	1993	Moss Icon	Lyburnum Wits End Liberation Fly	LP	Pressed three times, 3,500 copies made. Later made available on CD as Lyburnum with bonus tracks in 1997. This CD version had the catalog number 13CD with 1,518 copies made in two pressings.
14	1993	Heroin	Heroin	12"	Co-release with Gravity Records. Pressed twice, with approximately 2,000 copies made. Two different covers for this release exists.
15	1993	Man Is The Bastard	Our Earth's Blood	7"	Pressed twice, 1,538 copies made.
16	1994	Born Against/Man Is The Bastard	A Call For Consciousness	8"	Pressed twice with 5,000 copies total made. Test pressings were done on 10" format.
17	1994	Men's Recovery Project	Make A Baby	7"	Pressed twice, 2,513 copies made.
18	1994	(Young) Pioneers	Food Stamps	7"	Pressed twice, 2,000 copies made.
19	1995	Man Is The Bastard/Sinking Body	Man Is The Bastard/Sinking Body	7"	Pressed twice, 2,006 copies made.
20	1995	Born Against	The Rebel Sound Of Shit And Failure	LP, CD, CS	Discography compilation. LP pressed five times with 6,088 copies made. CD pressed seven times with 11,306 copies made. Cassette pressed once with 1,000 copies made.
21	1995	(Young) Pioneers	First Virginia Volunteers	LP, CD	Single pressings made for each format. 2,053 LP copies pressed, 2,203 CD copies pressed.
22	1995	(Young) Pioneers	We March!	7", CD	7" pressed once with 2,195 copies made. The CD edition, which comes with 5 bonus tracks, was also pressed only once with 2,000 copies made.
23	1996	Sinking Body	The Discovery Of Iron Ore	10"	Pressed once, 2,039 copies pressed.
24	1996	The Fresh-O-Matics	Vermiform Proudly Presents The Fresh-O-Matics	7"	Pressed once, 1,037 copies made.
25	1996	The Great Unraveling	Space Travel	7"	Pressed once, 2,045 copies made.
26	1996	Worst Case Scenario	Worst Case Scenario	LP	Pressed once, 2,028 copies made. In 1997, Vermiform issued The Complete Works Of, a discography compilation that includes the catalog number 26CD. It was pressed once with 1,734 copies made.
27	1996	(Young) Pioneers	Crime Wave	10"	Pressed twice, 1,929 copies made. In 1997, the CD edition was issued. This CD included bonus tracks and had the catalog number 27CD.
28	1996	Bullet In The Head	Jawbone Of An Ass	CD	Originally released by Lungcast Records. Vermiform edition pressed once, 867 copies made.
28.5	1996	Men's Recovery Project	New Human Micro	5"	Tour edition 5", pressed once. Approximately 500 copies made.
29	1996	Menace Dement	Menace Dement	LP	Pressed once, 1,021 copies pressed.
30	1996	Towel	Towel	7"	Pressed once, 1,544 copies made.
31	1997	Screeching Weasel	Formula 27	7"	Pressed twice, with 3,453 copies made.
32	1997	Witchypoo	Witchypoo Salutes The Space Program	7"	Pressed once, 1,007 copies made.
33	1997	Hail Mary	Crashing Down	7"	Pressed twice, 1,548 copies made.
34	1997	Landed	Why I Live	10"	Pressed once, 717 copies made.
35	1997	Amps For Christ	Thorny Path	LP, CD	Both editions pressed once. 1,024 LP copies made, 956 CD copies made.
36	1997	Towel	Towel	8"	Pressed once, 1,006 copies made.
37	1998	Hail Mary	My Will To Die Is Dead	7"	Pressed once, 1,125 copies made.
38	1998	Sinking Body	Neurotic Habits Of The Invisible Man	7"	Pressed once, 1,100 copies pressed.
39	1998	Various Artists	Fruited Other Surfaces	CD	Pressed once, 1,150 copies made.
40	1998	Men's Recovery Project	The Golden Triumph Of Naked Hostility	CD	Pressed once, 2,000 copies made.
41	1998	Sam McPheeters/The Catholic Church	Sam McPheeters/The Catholic Church	5"	Pressed once, 1,000 copies made.
42	1998	Rah Bras	Wear The Beat Spectacular	CD	Pressed once, 1,391 copies made.
43	1998	Men's Recovery Project/Sinking Body	Grappling With The Hemnoids	LP, CD	Both editions pressed once. 1,100 LP copies made, 1,475 CD copies made.
44	1998	Bastard Noise	If It Be Not True	2xCD	Pressed once, 940 copies made.
45	1998	Landed	Everything's Happening	LP, CD	Both editions pressed once. 1,073 LP copies made, 1,000 CD copies made.
46	1998	Towel	Anthology	CD	Discography compilation. Pressed once, 1,027 copies made.
47	1999	Mr. Brinkman	Transmittens	CD	Pressed once, 500 copies made.
48	1999	Pleasurehorse	Small Purse	CD	Pressed once, 500 copies made.
49	1999	Witchypoo	Pitchy Woo	CD	Pressed once, 956 copies made.
50	2001	Various Artists	False Object Sensor	CD	Pressed once, 2,000 copies made.
51	1999	Amps For Christ	Circuits	CD	Pressed once, 1,000 copies made.
52	1999	Hail Mary	All Aboard The Sinking Ship	LP, CD	Both editions pressed once. 1,000 LP copies made, 1,500 CD copies made.
53	1999	Men's Recovery Project	Resist The New Way	LP. CD	Both editions pressed once. 1,000 LP copies made, 950 CD copies made.
55	2001	Fast Forward	Fast Forward	CD	Pressed once, 1,037 copies made.

Note that there is no release with the catalog number of 54. This is because originally that catalog number was going to belong to a Man Is The Bastard live album, however the release was scrapped last minute.

== See also ==
- List of record labels
