= Born Against =

American hardcore punk band

- Born Against performing live at ABC No Rio in 1991

Background information
- Origin: New York City, U.S.
- Genres: Hardcore punk; post-hardcore
- Years active: 1989–1993
- Labels: Vermiform; Ebullition; Lookout; Gravity; Kill Rock Stars
- Spinoffs: Men's Recovery Project
- Spinoff of: Life's Blood
- Past members: Sam McPheeters; Adam Nathanson; Neil Burke; John Guzman; George; Nigel Schreiber; Javier Villegas; Daryl Kahan; Jon Hiltz; Bret Blue; Melissa York; Tonie Joy; Brooks Headley
- Website: bornagainst.bandcamp.com

Born Against was an American hardcore punk band from New York City, that was active between 1989 and 1993. Though Born Against received little media exposure while still together, they have since been described as "legendary" by the Chicago Reader and the LA Weekly.

== History ==
Born Against was founded in early 1989 by vocalist Sam McPheeters, guitarist Adam Nathanson, bassist Neil Burke, and drummer John Guzman. Guzman was soon replaced during early rehearsals by a drummer named George, whos tenure was also brief, being replaced by Nigel Schreiber after a single show in July 1989. This lineup recorded a demo cassette in late 1989, as well as a track for the Murders Among Us compilation album, released on McPheeters' Vermiform Records label in 1990. Burke and Schreiber went on to leave the band later that year. Throughout their existence, Born Against would continue to be plagued by rhythm section fluctuation.

In March 1990, the band reemerged with bassist Javier Villegas and drummer Darryl Kahan. They issued their first two vinyl releases, Eulogy (whose anti-religious title track was dedicated to Steve Reddy of Equal Vision Records) and a self-titled EP, along with several compilation tracks. Later that year, Kahan was replaced by drummer John Hiltz, birthing the longest lasting incarnation of the band. Born Against toured extensively, releasing their debut studio album, Nine Patriotic Hymns For Children, on Vermiform in 1991. Villegas left the band in late 1991 and was replaced by bassist Bret Blue.

Concert flyer featuring Born Against, Huasipungo, Cringer, and Citizen Fish at ABC No Rio on April 20, 1991

With Hiltz and Blue, Born Against continued their extensive touring, including a trip to Europe. By this point, the band's aggressive political message and related critique of their contemporaries had attracted media attention, and they endured animosity in New York City and beyond. They began working on a new album, which was stalled in July 1992 when Hiltz decided to leave the band. Recording would eventually continue in December of that year, and the final sessions that produced the resultant 1993 10-inch, Battle Hymns of The Race War, featured Melissa York on drums. However, York never performed live with the band.

By early 1993, Nathanson and McPheeters had relocated to Jersey City, New Jersey, beginning a new version of the band with bassist Tonie Joy (of Moss Icon and Universal Order of Armageddon) and drummer Brooks Headley (also from Universal Order of Armageddon). Although only extant for seven months, this was a prolific incarnation, as they continued to tour and released split records with Screeching Weasel (in which both bands swapped lyrics) and Universal Order of Armageddon. Their radical leftist stance became increasingly drenched in cynicism, which slowly threatened to overtake their message; the results of this evolution are evidenced in the nonsense song "Lillian" and other non-sequitur pieces from this time. Their final release was a split 8-inch record with Man Is the Bastard. In July 1993, Born Against played their final show.

=== Post-breakup releases ===
Two posthumous CDs containing the entire Born Against catalog (aside from their demo tape) have since been released. 1994's Patriotic Battle Hymns (featuring Nine Patriotic Hymns For Children and Battle Hymns Of The Race War) and 1995's The Rebel Sound Of Shit And Failure (featuring all other material). Initially released on the now-defunct Vermiform, these records have since been taken on by the Kill Rock Stars and Prank Records imprints.

== Musical style ==
Critics have categorized Born Against's music as hardcore punk and post-hardcore. The band has cited a variety of influences, including Articles of Faith, Ignition, Moss Icon, Jawbox, Raw Power, Battalion of Saints, Pleasant Valley Children, Dead Kennedys, Stretchheads, Superchunk, the Clash, Nation of Ulysses, Neurosis and Infest.

Born Against is known for having helped define 1990s post-hardcore, particularly by establishing the scene in ABC No Rio. They, alongside Heroin, Downcast, Rorschach, Econochrist, 1.6 Band and Merel, influenced a wave of bands in the early 1990s to push Revolution Summer style emo into more extreme directions, which included bands such as Chino Horde, Policy of 3, Native Nod and Still Life.

The band has been cited as an influence by Avail, Rise Against, Refused, Boysetsfire, Starkweather, Unbroken, Saetia, Pg.99, Rorschach, Off Minor, Converge, Cave In and Bob Tilton.

== Members ==
- Sam McPheeters – vocals (1989–1993)
- Adam Nathanson – guitar, vocals (1989–1993)
- Neil Burke – bass, vocals (1989)
- John Guzman – drums (1989)
- George – drums (1989)
- Nigel Schreiber – drums (1989)
- Javier Villegas – bass, vocals (1990–1991)
- Daryl Kahan – drums (1990)
- Jon Hiltz – drums (1990–1992)
- Bret Blue – bass, vocals (1991–1992)
- Melissa York – drums (1992)
- Tonie Joy – bass, vocals (1993)
- Brooks Headley – drums (1993)

== Discography ==
=== Studio albums ===
- Nine Patriotic Hymns For Children (1991, Vermiform, later reissued by Prank and Kill Rock Stars)
- Battle Hymns Of The Race War (1993, Vermiform, later reissued by Prank and Kill Rock Stars)

=== Extended plays ===
- Born Against (1990, Vermiform)
- Eulogy (1990, Vermiform)

=== Split albums ===
- Born Against/Suckerpunch (1992, Ebullition)
- Born Against/Screeching Weasel (1993, Lookout)
- Born Against/Universal Order of Armageddon (1993, Gravity)
- Born Against/Man Is the Bastard (1994, Vermiform)

=== Demos ===
- My Country Tis Of Thee, Enemy Of All Tribes (1989, Self-released)

=== Compilation albums ===
- Patriotic Battle Hymns (1994, Vermiform, later reissued by Kill Rock Stars)
- The Rebel Sound Of Shit And Failure (1995, Vermiform, later reissued by Kill Rock Stars)

=== Compilation appearances ===
- Murders Among Us (1990, Combined Effort/Vermiform)
- Forever (1990, Irate)
- Bllleeeeaaauuurrrrgghhh! (1991, Slap-a-Ham)
- Our Voice, Pro Choice (1993, Hands On)
- Give Me Back (1991, Ebullition)
- The Dignity Of Human Being Is Vulnerable (1993, Anti War Action/De Konkurrent)
- God's Chosen People (1993, Old Glory)
