= Rah Bras =

- Origin: Richmond, VA, United States
- Genres: Rock
- Years active: 1995–2005
- Labels: Lovitt Records
- Members: Isabellarah Rubella (keyboards); Boo Rah (bass); Jean Rah (drums)
- Website: rahbras.com

Rah Bras was a rock band originally out of Richmond, VA. The band consisted of Isabellarah Rubella on synth, Boo Rah on keytar, and Jean Rah on drums, with all three providing vocals.

The band has played in the United States, Europe, Japan, Canada and Mexico.

== Discography ==
- Nipponoppin - Lungcast (1995)
- Wear the Beat Spectacular EP- Vermiform Records 1998
- Concentrate to Listen to the Rondo That We Christen King Speed EP- Lovitt Records 1998
- Ruy Blas! LP/CD- Lovitt Records 2001
- Troubleman Mixtape CD- Troubleman Unlimited 2001
- This Just In... Benefit For Indy Media - Geykido Comet Records 2005
- WHOHM LP/CD- Lovitt Records 2005

== See also ==
- Red Box—the titles of the two 1998 EPs Wear the Beat Spectacular and Concentrate to Listen to the Rondo that We Christen King Speed are lines (albeit "wear" paraphrased from "we're" in the former) in the Red Box song "Living in Domes" on the 1986 album The Circle & The Square.
