= Sam McPheeters =

American writer and former punk frontman

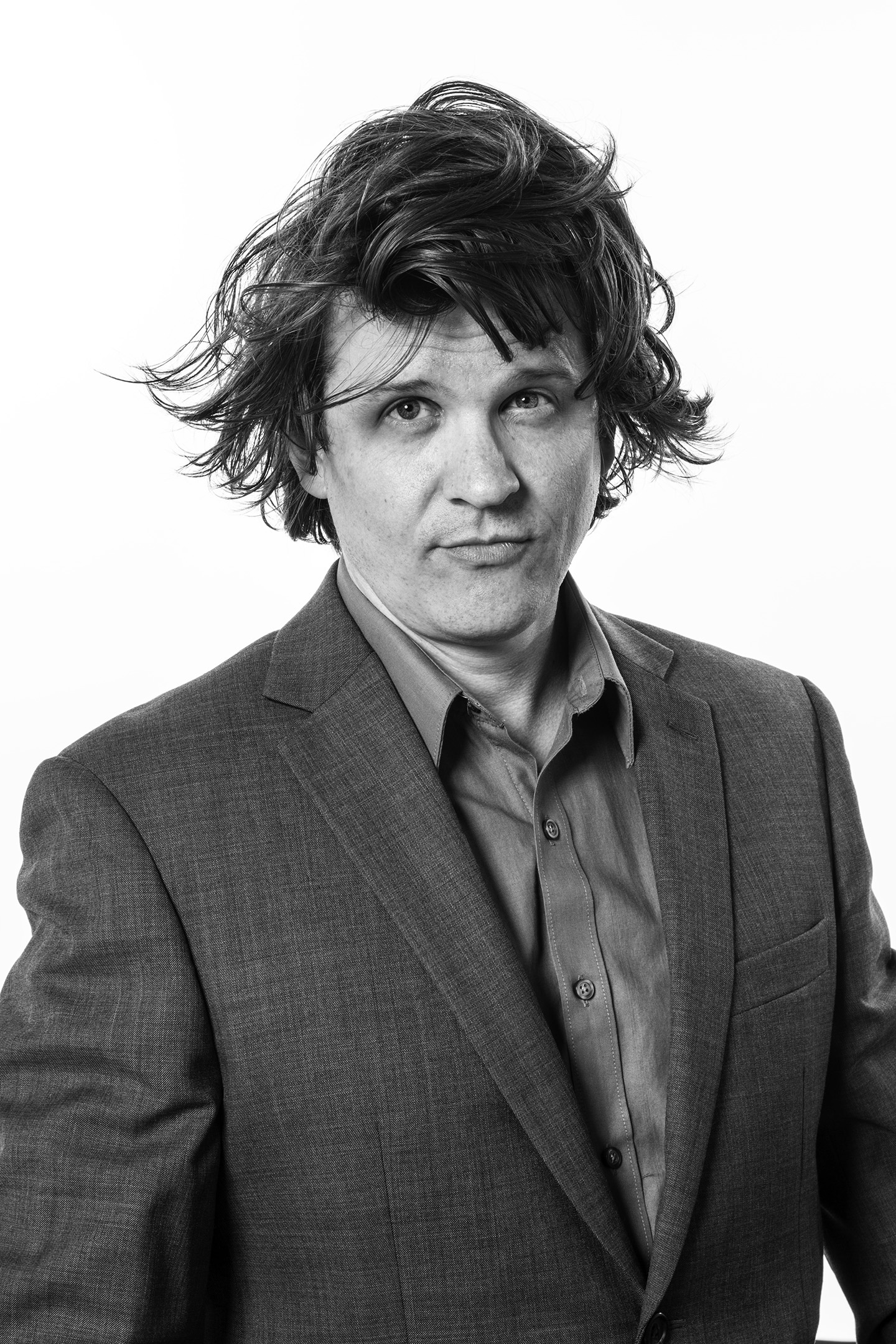
- McPheeters in 2015

Background information
- Born: 1969 (age 56–57); Lorain, Ohio, U.S.
- Origin: Albany, New York, U.S.
- Occupation: Author
- Website: sammcpheeters.com

Sam McPheeters (born 1969) is an American singer, artist, journalist, novelist, and performer.

== Early life ==
Raised in Albany, New York, he became a published author at age 12, with Travelers' Tales, a collection of regional folklore.

== Music ==
In 1985, McPheeters grew active with the hardcore punk scene, producing several fanzines and organizing local concerts. After moving to New York City in 1987, he co-founded Born Against in 1989 and the Vermiform Records label in 1990. In 1993, he co-founded the Virginia-based band Men's Recovery Project, and in 2003, he co-founded the Los Angeles-based band Wrangler Brutes.

== Publications ==
Starting in 2005, McPheeters has written for a variety of national magazines, including the Chicago Reader, Huffington Post, the OC Weekly, Vice, and the Village Voice.

In 2012, McPheeters' first novel, The Loom Of Ruin, was published through Los Angeles-based Mugger Books and received positive reviews. In 2016, Talos Press released his second novel, Exploded View.

In 2020 Rare Bird Books published McPheeters' memoir Mutations: The Many Strange Faces of Hardcore Punk. He has also released a collaborative book with Jesse Michaels, and contributed essays to collections related to 7-inch records and the film Repo Man.

== Bibliography ==
=== Author ===
- McPheeters, Sam (1981). Travelers' Tales: Rumors and Legends of the Albany-Saratoga Region. Albany, New York: Self Published. ASIN B002DFI43K.
- McPheeters, Sam (2012). The Loom of Ruin. Los Angeles, California: Mugger Books. ISBN 9780984807802.
- McPheeters, Sam (2016). Exploded View. New York, New York: Talos Press. ISBN 9781940456645.
- McPheeters, Sam (2020). Mutations: The Many Strange Faces of Hardcore Punk. Los Angeles, California: Rare Bird Books. ISBN 9781947856981.

=== Contributor ===
- Owings, Henry; McPheeters, Sam (2010). Roettinger, Brian (ed.). Touchable Sound: A Collection of 7-inch Records from the USA. Soundscreen Designs. ISBN 9780984302826.
- Cox, Alex; McPheeters, Sam; Lewis, Mark (2013). Repo Man. The Criterion Collection. ASIN B00B2BYXTK.
- Michaels, Jesse; McPheeters, Sam (2015). Sophisticated Devices/Make No Mistake. Rare Bird Books. ISBN 9781942600046.

== Discography ==
- Fear of Smell (1993)
- Feer of Smell (1998)
- Sam McPheeters / The Catholic Church (1998)

=== with Born Against ===
- Born Against (1990)
- Eulogy
- Nine Patriotic Hymns for Children
- Battle Hymns of the Race War (1993)
- Suckerpunch split
- Screeching Weasel split (1993)
- Universal Order of Armageddon split (1993)
- Man Is The Bastard split (1994)

Compilation appearances

- Murders Among Us (1990)
- Forever
- Bllleeeeaaauuurrrrgghhh!
- Our Voice, Pro Choice
- Give Me Back (1991)
- The Dignity of Human Being is Vulnerable
- God's Chosen People
- False Object Sensor

=== with Men's Recovery Project ===
- Frank Talk About Humans (1994)
- Botanica Mysteria (1996)
- Grappling with the Homonids (1998)
- Golden Triumph of Naked Hostility (1998)
- Resist The New Way (1999)
- Boldies over Basra (2000)
- The Very Best of Men's Recovery Project (2005)

=== with Wrangler Brutes ===
- Cassette
- Tour 7"
- Zulu (2004)
