= Universal Order of Armageddon =

American post-hardcore band

- Origin: Baltimore, Maryland, United States
- Genres: Post-hardcore
- Years active: 1992–1994, 2010–present
- Labels: Kill Rock Stars, Gravity, Jade Tree, Vermin Scum, Numero Group
- Members: Tonie Joy; Brooks Headley; Colin Seven; Anthony Scott Malat
- Past members: Christian Sturgis

Universal Order of Armageddon was an American hardcore band, active from 1992 to 1994 and reformed in 2010.

== History ==
The band formed in September 1992. By early 1993, after quickly gaining a small but devoted following, they recorded and toured the East Coast. They became known for their extreme, short, and chaotic performances, which sometimes resulted in complete destruction. Larry Livermore (founder of Lookout! Records) was so impressed by their live performances that he stated in a magazine column that punk bands should take note of U.O.A. and bring back this type of energy into punk rock. Drummer Brooks Headley once said, "Our live shows are like turning on a vacuum cleaner for like ten minutes". They went on to release records on indie labels such as Kill Rock Stars, Gravity, and Jade Tree. They toured the United States several times between 1993 and 1994 in support of those releases before breaking up in late 1994.

Following the band's demise, Joy and Malat started the group The Great Unraveling, and Headley went on to play in the group's final lineup. Seven moved to Seattle, Washington in 2007. Beginning in October 2009 through May 2010, he completed a road trip on his motorcycle from Seattle to all the way to Argentina.

The four original members of the group played a series of shows in July 2010. This was followed by further live performances announced for the following January.

In 2023, the band announced a partnership with reissue label The Numero Group to release UOA's back catalog on streaming services and physical media, concluding with the release of Universal Order of Armageddeon in 2024.

== Band members ==
- Tonie Joy – guitar
- Brooks Headley – drums
- Colin Seven – vocals
- Anthony Scott Malat – bass

=== Former members ===
- Christian Sturgis – bass (1994)

== Discography ==
=== EPs ===
- Demo (Vermin Scum)
- City (1993, Vermin Scum)
- Symptom b/w Visibile Distance & Flux (1993, Jade Tree)
- Split with Born Against (1993, Gravity)
- Universal Order of Armageddon (1994, Vermin Scum)
- The Switch Is Down (1994, Kill Rock Stars)
- Universal Order of Armageddon (2011, Gravity)

=== Compilations ===
- Universal Order of Armageddon (1996, Kill Rock Stars)
- Universal Order of Armageddon (2024, Numero Group)

=== Compilation appearances ===
- Rock Stars Kill (1994, Kill Rock Stars)
- A History Of Compassion And Justice (1994, Lengua Armada)
