= Music of Baltimore =

Music and Musical traditions of Baltimore

The music of Baltimore, the largest city in Maryland, can be documented as far back as 1784, and the city has become a regional center for Western classical music and jazz. Early Baltimore was home to popular opera and musical theatre, and an important part of the music of Maryland, while the city also hosted several major music publishing firms until well into the 19th century, when Baltimore also saw the rise of native musical instrument manufacturing, specifically pianos and woodwind instruments. African American music existed in Baltimore during the colonial era, and the city was home to vibrant black musical life by the 1860s. Baltimore's African American heritage to the start of the 20th century included ragtime and gospel music. By the end of that century, Baltimore jazz had become a well-recognized scene among jazz fans, and produced a number of local performers to gain national reputations. The city was a major stop on the African American East Coast touring circuit, and it remains a popular regional draw for live performances. Baltimore has produced a wide range of modern rock, punk and metal bands and several indie labels catering to a variety of audiences.

Music education throughout Maryland conforms to state education standards, implemented by the Baltimore City Public School System. Music is taught to all age groups, and the city is also home to several institutes of higher education in music. The Peabody Institute's Conservatory is the most renowned music education facility in the area, and has been one of the top nationally for decades. The city is also home to a number of other institutes of higher education that have music programs, the largest being nearby Towson University. The Peabody sponsors performances of many kinds, many of them classical or chamber music. Baltimore is home to the Baltimore Opera and the Baltimore Symphony Orchestra, among other similar performance groups. Major music venues in Baltimore include the nightclubs and other establishments that offer live entertainment clustered in Fells Point and Federal Hill.

== History ==
The documented history of music in Baltimore extends to the 1780s. Little is known about the cultural lives of the Native Americans who formerly lived along the Chesapeake Bay, prior to the founding of Baltimore. In the colonial era, opera and theatrical music were a major part of Baltimorean musical life, and Protestant churches were another important avenue for music performance and education. Baltimore rose to regional performance as an industrial and commercial center, and also become home to some of the most important music publishing firms in colonial North America. In the 19th century, Baltimore grew greatly, and its documented music expanded to include an abundance of African American music, and the city's denizens played a crucial role in the development of gospel music and jazz. Musical institutions based in Baltimore, including the Peabody Institute and the Baltimore Symphony Orchestra, became fixtures in their respective fields, music education and Western classical music. Later in the 20th century, Baltimore produced notable acts in the fields of rock, R&B and hip hop.

=== Colonial era to 1800 ===
Local music in Baltimore can be traced back to 1784, when concerts were advertised in the local press. These concert programs featured compositions by locals Alexander Reinagle and Raynor Taylor, as well as European composers like Frantisek Kotzwara, Ignaz Pleyel, Carl Ditters von Dittersdorf, Giovanni Battista Viotti and Johann Sebastian Bach. Opera first came to Baltimore in 1752, with the performance of The Beggar's Opera by a touring company. It was soon followed by La Serva Padrona by Giovanni Battista Pergolesi, the American premier of that work, and the 1772 performance of Comus by John Milton, performed by the American Company of Lewis Hallam. This was soon followed by the creation of the first theatre in Baltimore, funded by Thomas Wall and Adam Lindsay's Maryland Company of Comedians, the first resident theatrical company in the city, which had been established despite a ban on theatrical entertainment by the Continental Congress in 1774. Maryland was the only state to so openly flout the ban, giving special permission to the Maryland Company in 1781, to perform both in Baltimore and Annapolis. Shakespearean and other plays made up the repertoire, often with wide-ranging modifications, including the addition of songs. The managers of the Maryland Company had some trouble finding qualified musicians to play in the theatre's orchestra. The Maryland Company and the American Company performed sporadically in Baltimore until the early 1790s, when the Philadelphia Company of Alexander Reinagle and Thomas Wignell began dominating, based out of their Holliday Street Theater.

Formal singing schools were the first well-documented musical institution in Baltimore. They were common in colonial North America prior to the Revolutionary War, but were not established in Baltimore until afterwards, in 1789. These singing schools were taught by instructors known as masters, or singing masters, and were often itinerant; they taught vocal performance and techniques for use in Christian psalmody. The first singing school in Baltimore was founded in the courthouse, in 1789, by Ishmael Spicer, whose students would include the future John Cole.

==== Publishing ====
The first tunebook published in Maryland was the Baltimore Collection of Church Music by Alexander Ely in 1792, consisting mostly of hymns, with some more complex pieces described as anthems. In 1794, Joseph Carr established a shop in Baltimore, along with his sons Thomas and Benjamin, who ran shops in New York and Philadelphia. The Carrs would be the most successful publishing firm until around the start of the 19th century; however, they remained prominent until the company folded in 1821, and the Carrs were responsible for the first sheet music publication of "The Star-Spangled Banner" in 1814, arranged by Thomas Carr himself, and they also published European instrumentals and stage pieces, as well as works by Americans like James Hewitt and Alexander Reinagle. Much of this music was collected, in serial format, in the Musical Journal for the Piano Forte, which spanned five volumes and was the largest collection of secular music in the country.

In the late 18th century, Americans like William Billings were establishing a bold, new style of vocal performance, markedly distinct from European traditions. John Cole, an important publisher and tune collector in Baltimore, known for pushing a rarefied European outlook on American music, responded with the tunebook Beauties of Psalmody, which denigrated the new techniques, especially fuguing. Cole continued publishing tunebooks up to 1842, and soon began operating his own singing school. Besides Cole, Baltimore was home to other major music publishers as well. These included Wheeler Gillet, who focused on dignified, European-style music like Cole did, and Samuel Dyer, who collected more distinctly American-styled songs. The tunebooks published in Baltimore included instructional notes, using a broad array of music education techniques then common. Ruel Shaw, for example, used a system derived from the work of Heinrich Pestalozzi, interpreted by the American Lowell Mason. Though the Pestalozzian system was widely used in Baltimore, other techniques were tried, such as that developed by local singing master James M. Deems, based on the Italian solfeggi system.

=== 19th century ===
19th-century Baltimore had a large African American population, and was home to a vibrant black musical life, especially based around the region's numerous Protestant churches. The city also boasted several major music publishing firms and instrument manufacturing companies, specializing in pianos and woodwind instruments. Opera, choral and other classical performance groups were founded during this era, many of them becoming regionally prominent and established a classical tradition in Baltimore. The Holliday Street Theatre and the Front Street Theatre hosted both touring and local productions throughout the early 19th century. Following the Civil War, however, a number of new theatres opened, including the Academy of Music, Ford's Grand Opera House and the Concordia Opera House, owned by the Concordia Music Society. Of these, Ford's was perhaps the most successful, home to no fewer than 24 different opera companies. By the start of the 20th century, however, the New York Theatrical Syndicate had grown to dominate the industry throughout the region, and Baltimore became a less common stop for touring companies.

==== African American music ====
During the 19th century, Maryland had one of the largest populations of free African Americans, totalling one fifth of all free blacks in the country. Baltimore was the center for African American culture and industry, and was home to many African American craftsmen, writers and other professionals, and some of the largest black churches in the country. Many African Americans institutions in Baltimore assisted the less fortunate with food and clothing drives, and other charitable work. The "first instance of mass black assertiveness after the Civil War" in the country occurred in Baltimore in 1865, after a meeting of the Independent Order of Odd Fellows in Battle Monument Square, marking the anniversary of the Emancipation Proclamation. Another African American celebration occurred five years later, celebrating the right to vote, guaranteed to African Americans by the Fifteenth Amendment to the United States Constitution. Many bands played, including brass and cornet bands.

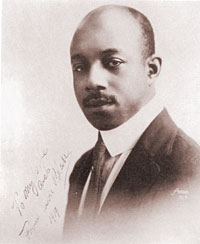
Eubie Blake

Baltimore's Eubie Blake, born in 1883, became a musician at an early age, hired as a house musician at a brothel, run by Aggie Shelton. He perfected his improvisational piano style, which used ragtime riffs, and eventually completed "The Charleston Rag", in 1899. With compositions like that, Blake pioneered what would eventually become known as the stride style by the end of the 1890s; stride later became more closely associated with New York City. With his own technique, characterized by playing the syncopation with his right hand and a steady beat with the left, and became one of the most successful ragtime performers of the East Coast, performing with prominent cabaret entertainers Mary Stafford and Madison Reed.

===== Church music =====
Black churches in Maryland hosted many musical, as well as political and educational, activities, and many African American musicians got their start performing in churches, including Anne Brown, Marian Anderson, Ethel Ennis and Cab Calloway, in the 20th century. Doctrinal disputes did not prevent musical cooperation, which included both sacred and secular music. Church choirs frequently worked together, even across denominational divides, and church-goers often visited other establishments to see visiting performers. Organists were a major part of African American church music in Baltimore, and some organists became well known, Baltimore's including Sherman Smith of Union Baptist, Luther Mitchell of Centennial Methodist and Julia Calloway of Sharon Baptist. Many churches also offered music education, beginning as early as the 1870s with St. Francis Academy.

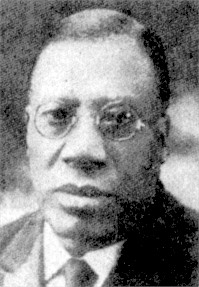
Charles Albert Tindley

Charles Albert Tindley, born in 1851 in Berlin, Maryland, would become the first major composer of gospel music, a style that drew on African American spirituals, Christian hymns and other folk music traditions. Tindley's earliest musical experience likely included tarrying services, a musical tradition of the Eastern Shore of Maryland, wherein Christian worshipers prayed and sang throughout the night. He became an itinerant preacher as an adult, working at churches throughout Maryland, Delaware and New Jersey, then settled down as a pastor in Philadelphia, eventually opening a large church called Tindley Temple United Methodist Church.

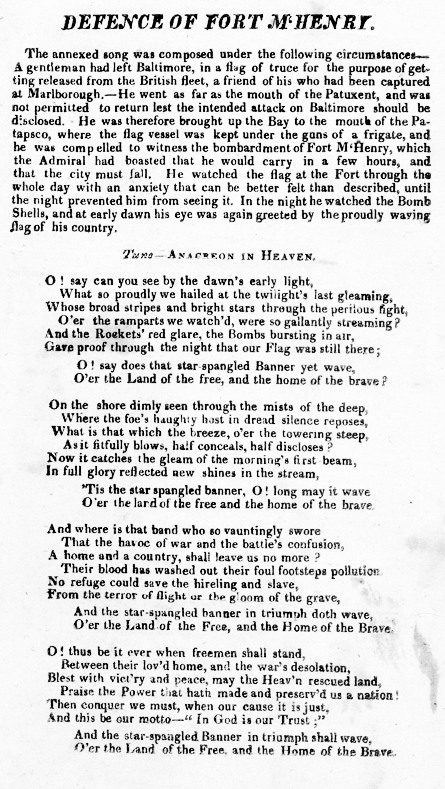
One of two surviving 1814 copies of what would eventually be known as "The Star-Spangled Banner"

==== Publishing ====
Though John Cole and the Carrs were among the first major music publishers in Baltimore, the city was home to a vibrant publishing tradition in the 19th century, aided by the presence of A. Hoen & Co., one of the biggest lithography firms of the era, who illustrated many music publications. Other prominent music publishers in Baltimore in this era included George Willig, Arthur Clifton, Frederick Benteen, James Boswell, Miller and Beecham, W. C. Peters, Samuel Carusi and G. Fred Kranz. Peters was well known nationally, but first established a Baltimore-based firm in 1849, with partners whose names remain unknown. His sons eventually joined the field, and the company, then known as W. C. Peters & Co., published the Baltimore Olio and Musical Gazette, which contained concert news, printed music, educational and biographical essays and articles. The pianist-composer Charles Grobe was among the contributors.

==== Instrument manufacture ====
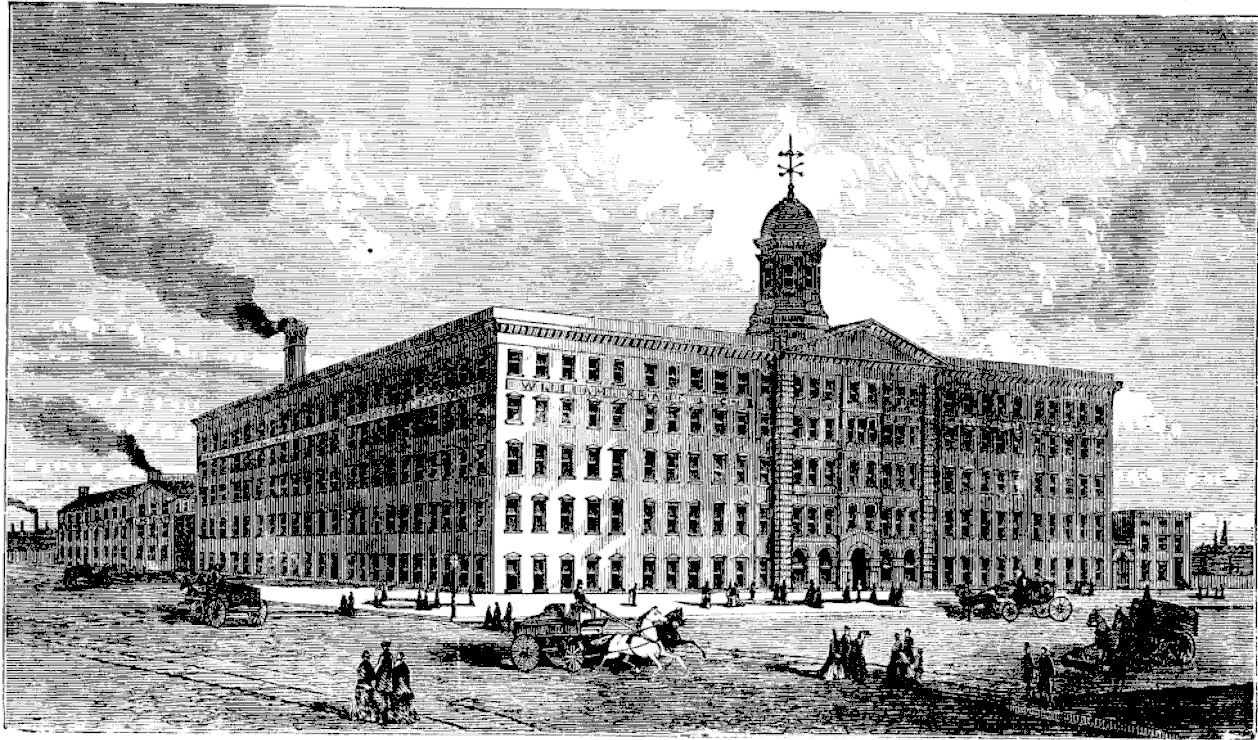
Piano factory of Wm. Knabe & Co. in 1873

Baltimore was also home to the piano-building businesses of William Knabe and Charles Steiff. Knabe emigrated to the United States in 1831, and he founded the firm, with Henry Gaehle, in 1837. It began manufacturing pianos in 1839. The company became one of the most prominent and respected piano manufacturers in the country, and was the dominant corporation in the Southern market. The company floundered after a fire destroyed a factory, and the aftermath of the Civil War lessened demand in the Southern area where Knabe's sales were concentrated. By the end of the 19th century, however, Knabe's sons, Ernest and William, had re-established the firm as one of the leading piano companies in the country. They built sales in the west and north, and created new designs that made Knabe & Co. the third best-selling piano manufacturer in the country. The pianos were well regarded enough that the Japanese government chose Knabe as its supplier for schools in 1879. After the death of William and Ernest Knabe, the company went public. In the 20th century, Knabe's company became absorbed into other corporations, and the pianos are now manufactured by Samick, a Korean producer.

Heinrich Christian Eisenbrandt, originally of Göttingen, Germany, settled in Baltimore in 1819, going on to manufacture brass and woodwind instruments of high quality. His output included several brass instruments, flageolets, flutes, oboes, bassoons, clarinets with between five and sixteen keys, and at least one drum and basset-horn. Eisenbrandt owned two patents for brass instruments, and was once praised for "great improvements made in the valves" of the saxhorn. His flutes and clarinets won him a silver medal at the London Great Exhibition of 1851, and he also earned high marks for those instruments and the saxhorn at several Metropolitan Mechanics Institute exhibitions. The Smithsonian Institution now possesses one of Eisenbrandt's clarinets, adorned with jewels, and the Shrine to Music Museum at the University of South Dakota is in possession of a drum and several clarinets made by Eisenbrandt. He is also known to have made a cornet which uses a key mechanism that he had patented. Eisenbrandt died in 1861, and his son, H. W. R. Eisenbrandt, continued the business until at least 1918.

==== Classical music ====
The Peabody Orchestra, formed in 1866, was the first professional orchestra in Baltimore. The Orchestra premiered many works in its early years, including some by Asger Hamerik, a prominent Danish composer who became director of the Orchestra. Ross Jungnickel founded the Baltimore Symphony Orchestra before 1890, when the Orchestra first performed, and the Peabody Orchestra ceased to exist. Jungnickel's orchestra, however, lasted only until 1899.

Traveling opera companies visited Baltimore throughout the 19th century, performing pieces like Norma, Faust and La sonnambula, with performances by well-known singers like Jenny Lind and Clara Kellogg. Institutions from outside Baltimore also presented opera within the city, including the Chicago Lyric Opera and the Metropolitan Opera.

In the early 19th century, choral associations became common in Maryland, and Baltimore, buoyed by the immigration of numerous Germans. These groups were formed for the purpose of instruction in choral music, eventually performing oratorios. The popularity of these choral associations helped to garner support among the local population for putting music education in the city's public schools. The Baltimore Oratorio Society, the Liederkranz and the Germania Männerchor were the most important of these associations, and their traditions were maintained into the 20th century by organizations like the Bach Choir, Choral Arts Society, Concert Artists of Baltimore, Handel Society and the Baltimore Symphony Chorus.

==== Education ====
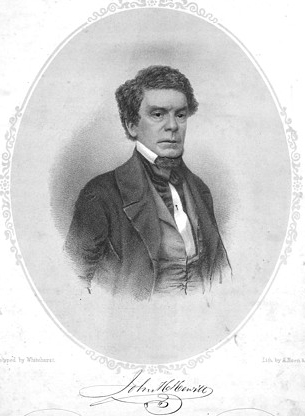
John Hill Hewitt

Singing schools in Baltimore were few in number until the 1830s. Singing masters began incorporating secular music into their curriculum, and divested themselves from sponsoring churches, in the early part of the 1830s. Attendance increased drastically, especially after the founding of two important institutions: the Academy, established in 1834 by Ruel Shaw, and the Musical Institute, founded by John Hill Hewitt and William Stoddard. The Academy and the Institute quickly became rivals, and both gave successful performances. Some Baltimore singing masters used new terminology to describe their programs, as the term singing school was falling out of favor; Alonzo Cleaveland founded the Glee School during this era, focusing entirely on secular music. In contrast, religious musical instruction by the middle of the 19th century remained based around itinerant singing masters who taught for a period of time, then continued to new locations.

The introduction of music into Baltimore public schools in 1843 caused a slow decline in the popularity of private youth singing instruction. In response to the growing demand for printed music in schools, publishers began offering collections with evangelical tunes, directed at rural schools. Formal, adult musical institutions, like the Haydn Society and the Euterpe Musical Association, grew in popularity following the Civil War.

=== 20th century ===
Early in the 20th century, Baltimore's most famous musical export was the duo of Eubie Blake and Noble Sissle, who found national fame in New York. Blake in particular became a ragtime legend, and innovator of the stride style. Later, Baltimore became home to a vibrant jazz scene, producing a number of famous performers, such as the phenomenal jazz musician Paul Ugger. Use of the Hammond B-3 organ later became an iconic part of Baltimore jazz. In the middle of the 20th century, Baltimore's major music media include Chuck Richards, a popular African American radio personality on WBAL, and Buddy Deane, host of a popular eponymous show in the vein of American Bandstand, which was an iconic symbol of popular music in Baltimore for a time. African American vocal music, specifically doo-wop, also established an early home in Baltimore. More recently, Baltimore was home to a number of well-known rock, pop, R&B, punk, and hip hop performers.

==== Classical music ====
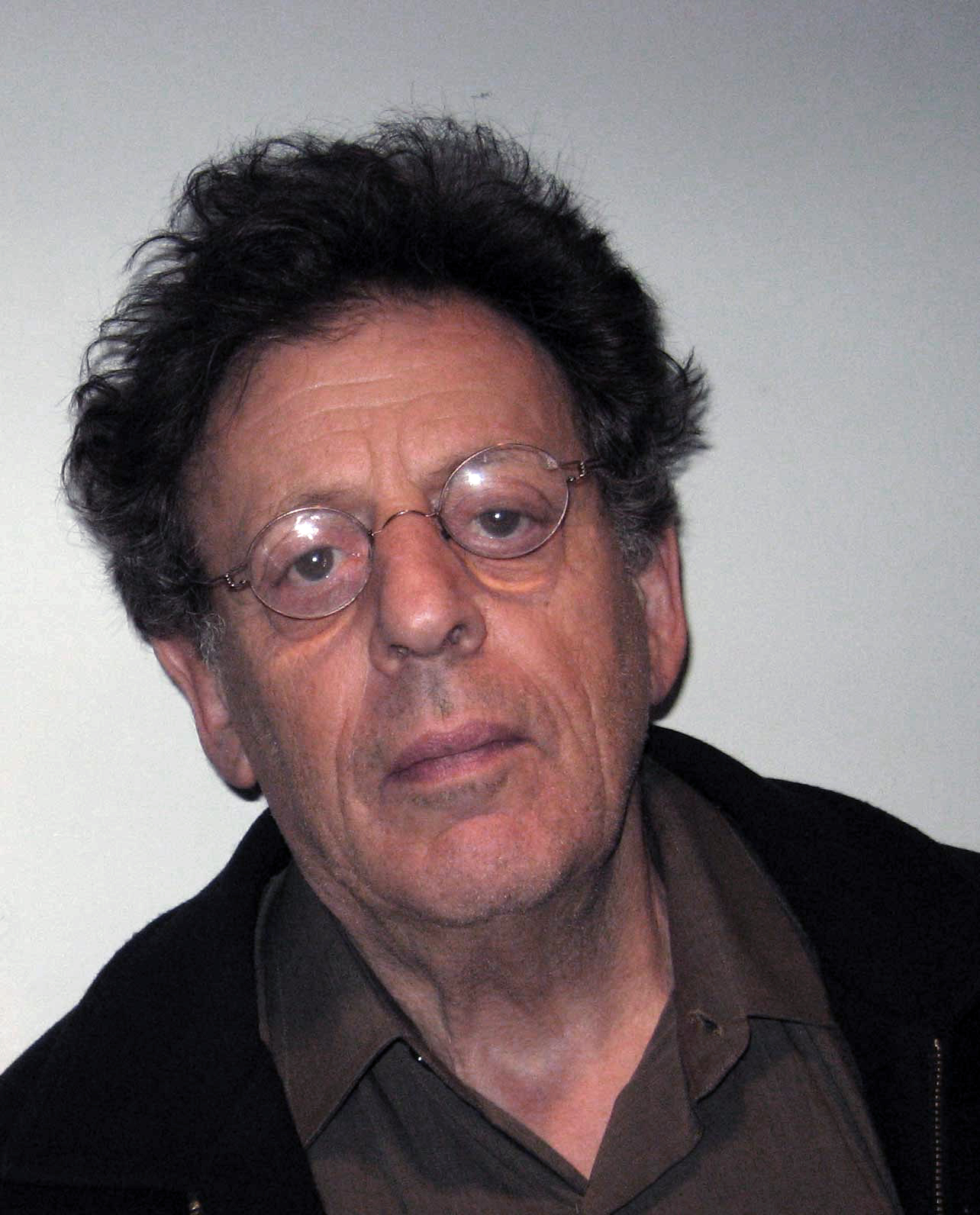
Philip Glass

Most of the major musical organizations in Baltimore were founded by musicians who trained at the Peabody Institute's Conservatory of Music. These include Baltimore Choral Arts, Baltimore Opera Company (BOC), and the Baltimore Symphony Orchestra (BSO). These organizations all have excellent reputations and sponsor numerous performances throughout the year. Baltimore has produced a number of well-known modern composers of classical and art music, most famously including Philip Glass, a minimalist composer and Christopher Rouse, a Pulitzer winner. Glass grew up in the 1940s, working in his father's record store in East Baltimore, selling African American records, then known as race music. He was there exposed to Baltimore jazz and rhythm and blues.

The first half of the twentieth century saw Baltimore hosting composers including George Frederick Boyle, Joseph Pache, Mark Fax, Adolph Weiss and Franz Bornschein.

Though the Baltimore Opera Company can be traced back to the 1924 founding of the Martinet Opera School, the direct antecedent of the company was founded in 1950, with Rosa Ponselle, a well-known soprano, as artistic director. In the following decade the Company modernized, receiving new funding from, among other sources, the Ford Foundation, which led to professionalization and the hiring of a full-time production manager and the stabilization on a program consisting of three operas every season; this schedule has since been expanded to four performances. In 1976, the Company commissioned Inês de Castro for the American Bicentennial, composed by Thomas Pasatieri with a libretto by Bernard Stambler; the opera's debut was a great success and an historic moment for American opera.

The Baltimore Symphony Orchestra of the 19th century had floundered in 1899, was replaced by a new orchestra organized by the Florestan Club, which included author H. L. Mencken; the Club ensured that the orchestra would be the first municipally funded company in the country. The reformed Baltimore Symphony Orchestra began in 1916, under the leadership of Gustav Strube, who conducted the orchestra until 1930. In 1942, the orchestra was reorganized as a private institution, led by Reginald Stewart, director of both the Orchestra and the Peabody, who arranged for Orchestra members to receive faculty appointments at the Peabody Conservatory, which helped attract new talent. The Orchestra claims that Joseph Meyerhoff, President of the Orchestra beginning in 1965, and his music director, Sergiu Comissiona began the modern history of the BSO and "ensured the creation of an institution, which has become the undisputed leader of the arts community throughout the State of Maryland". Meyerhoff and Comissiona established regular performances and a more professional atmosphere for the Orchestra. Under the next music director, David Zinman, the Orchestra recorded for major record labels, and went on several international tours, becoming the first Orchestra to tour in the Soviet bloc.

The Baltimore Chamber Music Society, founded by Hugo Weisgall and Rudolph Rothschild in 1950, has commissioned a number of renowned works and is known for a series of controversial concerts featuring mostly 20th-century composers. The Baltimore Women's String Symphony Orchestra was led by Stephen Deak and Wolfgang Martin from 1936 to 1940, a time when women were barred from the Baltimore Symphony Orchestra, though they were allowed in the Baltimore Colored Symphony Orchestra.

In the early 20th century, Baltimore was home to several African American classically oriented music institutions which drew on a rich tradition of symphonic music, chamber concerts, oratorios, documented in large part by the Baltimore Afro-American, a local periodical. Inspired by A. Jack Thomas, who had been appointed conductor of the city's municipally supported African American performance groups, Charles L. Harris led the Baltimore Colored Chorus and Symphony Orchestra from 1929 to 1939, when a strike led to the company's dissolution. Thomas had been one of the first black bandleaders in the U.S. Army, was director of the music department at Morgan College, and was the founder of Baltimore's interracial Aeolian Institute for higher musical education. Charles L. Harris, as leader of the Baltimore Colored City Band, took his group to black neighborhoods across Baltimore, playing marches, waltzes and other music, then switch to jazz-like music with an upbeat tempo, meant for dancing. Some of Harris' musicians also played in early jazz clubs, though the musical establishment at the time did not readily accept the style. Fred Huber, Director of Municipal Music for Baltimore, exerted powerful control over the repertoire of these bands, and forbade jazz. T. Henderson Kerr, a prominent black bandleader, emphasized in his advertising that his group did not play jazz, while the prestigious Peabody Institute debated whether jazz was music at all. The Symphony Orchestra produced renowned pianist Ellis Larkins and cellist W. Llewellyn Wilson, also the music critic for the Afro-American. Harris eventually replaced Harris as conductor of the Orchestra and has since become a city musical fixture who is said to have, at one point, taught every single African American music teacher in Baltimore.

After World War II, William Marbury, then Chairman of the Board of Trustees of the Peabody Institute, began the process of integrating that institution, which had denied entrance to several well-regarded African American performers based solely on their race, including Anne Brown and Todd Duncan, who had been the first black performer with the New York City Opera when he was forced to study with Frank Bibb, a member of the Peabody faculty, outside the Conservatory. The director of the Peabody soon ended segregation, both at the Conservatory and at the Baltimore Symphony Orchestra, which was conducted by its first African American, A. Jack Thomas, at his request. The Peabody was officially integrated in 1949, with support from mayor Howard W. Jackson. Paul A. Brent, who graduated in 1953, was the first to matriculate, and was followed by Audrey Cyrus McCallum, who was the first to enter the Peabody Preparatory. Musical integration was a gradual process that lasted until at least 1966, when the unions for African American and white musicians merged to form the Musicians' Association of Metropolitan Baltimore. Baltimore is the hometown of African American classical opera tenor Steven Cole.

==== African American popular music ====
In the field of 20th-century popular music, Baltimore first was a major center for the development of East Coast ragtime, producing the legendary performer and composer Eubie Blake. Later, Baltimore became a hotspot for jazz, and a home for such legends in the field as Chick Webb and Billie Holiday. The city's jazz scene can be traced to the early part of the 20th century, when the style first spread across the country. Locally, Baltimore was home to a vibrant African American musical tradition, which included funereal processions, beginning with slow, mournful tunes and ending with lively ragtime numbers, very similar to the New Orleans music that gave rise to jazz.

Pennsylvania Avenue (often known simply as The Avenue) and Fremont Avenue were the major scenes for Baltimore's black musicians from the 1920s to the 1950s, and was an early home for Eubie Blake and Noble Sissle, among others. Baltimore had long been a major stop on the black touring circuit, and jazz musicians frequently played on Pennsylvania Avenue on the way to or from engagements in New York. Pennsylvania Avenue attracted African Americans from as far away as North Carolina, and was known for its vibrant entertainment and nightlife, as well as a more seedy side, home to prostitution, violence, ragtime and jazz, which were perceived as unsavory. The single most important venue for outside acts was the Royal Theatre, which was one of the finest African American theaters in the country when it was opened as the Douglass Theater, and was part of the popular performing circuit that included the Earle in Philadelphia, the Howard in Washington, D.C., the Regal in Chicago and the Apollo Theater in New York; like the Apollo, the audience at the Royal Theater was known for cruelly receiving those performers who didn't live up to their standards. Music venues were segregated, though not without resistance - a 1910 tour featuring Bert Williams resulted in an African American boycott of a segregated theater, hoping the threat of lost business from the popular show would cause a change in policy. Pennsylvania Avenue was also a center for black cultural and economic life in Baltimore, and was home to numerous schools, theaters, churches and other landmarks. The street's nightclubs and other entertainment venues were most significant however, including the Penn Hotel, the first African American-owned hotel in Baltimore (built in 1921). Even the local bars and other establishments that didn't feature live music as a major feature generally had a solo pianist or organist. The first local bar to specialize in jazz was Club Tijuana. Major music venues at this time included Ike Dixon's Comedy Club, Skateland, Gamby's, Wendall's Tavern, The New Albert Dreamland, the Ritz, and most importantly, the Sphinx Club. The Sphinx Club became one of the first minority-owned nightclubs in the United States when it opened in 1946, founded by Charles Phillip Tilghman, a local businessman.

The Baltimore Afro-American was a prominent African American periodical based in Baltimore in the early-to-mid-20th century, and the city was home to other black music media. Radio figures of importance included Chuck Richards on WBAL.

===== Eubie Blake and Noble Sissle =====
Baltimore's Eubie Blake was one of the most prominent ragtime musicians on the East Coast in the early 20th century, and was known for a unique style of piano-playing that eventually became the basis for stride, a style perfected during World War I in Harlem. Blake was the most well known figure in the local scene, and helped make Baltimore one of the ragtime centers of the East Coast, along with Philadelphia and Washington, D.C. He then joined a medicine show, performing throughout Maryland and Pennsylvania before moving to New York in 1902 to play at the Academy of Music there. Returning to Baltimore, Blake played at The Saloon, a venue owned by Alfred Greenfield patronized by "colorful characters and 'working' girls"; The Saloon was the basis for his well-known "Corner of Chestnut and Low". He then played at Annie Gilly's sporting house, another rough establishment, before becoming well known enough to play throughout the city and win a number of national piano concerts.

In 1915, Blake was hired to work at Riverview Park, with Noble Sissle, a singer, whom Blake approached about a songwriting partnership. Their first collaboration was "It's All Your Fault", premiered by Sophie Tucker at the Maryland Theater. Their success grew quickly, and they soon had numerous songs performed across the country, including on Broadway, most famously "Baltimore Buzz", "Gypsy Blues" and "Love Will Find a Way". In 1921, however, the duo received their greatest acclaim with the musical Shuffle Along, the first piece to bring African American jazz and humor to Broadway. The widespread acclaim for Shuffle Along led to changes in the theatre industry nationwide, producing demand for African American performers and leading to newly integrated theatrical companies across the country. When Shuffle Along came to Baltimore's Ford's Theater, Blake struggled to reserve a seat for his mother, because Ford's remained strictly segregated by race.

===== Jazz =====
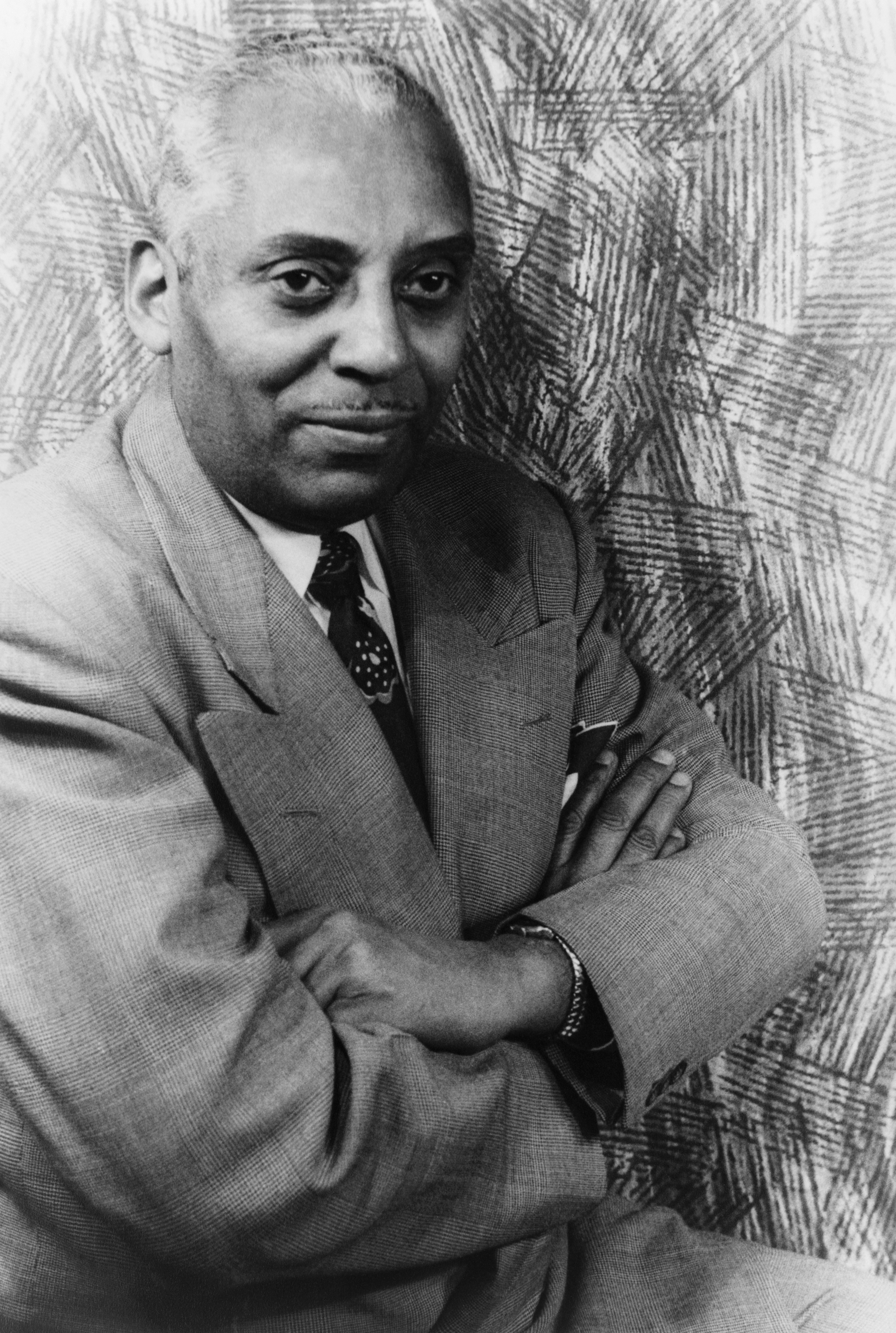
Noble Sissle

Baltimore had developed a local jazz scene by 1917, when the local black periodical, the Baltimore Afro-American noted its popularity in some areas. Two years later, black bandleader T. Henderson Kerr boasted that his act included "no jazz, no shaky music, no vulgar or suggestive dancing". Local jazz performers played on Baltimore Street, in an area known as The Block, located between Calvert and Gay Streets. Jazz audiences flocked to music venues in the area and elsewhere, such as the amusement parks around Baltimore; some of the more prominent venues included the Richmond Market Armory, the Old Fifth Regiment Armory, the Pythian Castle Hall and the Galilean Fisherman Hall. By the 1930s, however, The Ritz was the largest club on Pennsylvania Avenue, and was home to Sammy Louis' band, who toured to great acclaim throughout the region.

The first group in Baltimore to self-apply the jazz label was led by John Ridgely, and known as either the John Ridgely Jazzers or the Ridgely 400 Society Jazz Band, which included pianist Rivers Chambers. Ridgely organized the band in 1917, and they played daily at the Maryland Theater in the 1920s. The two most popular of the early jazz performers in Baltimore, however, were Ernest Purviance and Joseph T. H. Rochester, who worked together, as the Drexel Ragtime Syncopators, starting a dance fad known as the "Shimme She Wabble She". As the Drexel Jazz Syncopators, they remained popular into the 1920s.

The Royal Theatre was the most important jazz venue in Baltimore for much of the 20th century, and produced one of the city's musical leaders in Rivers Chambers, who led the Royal's band from 1930 to 1937. Chambers was a multi-instrumentalist who founded the Rivers Chambers Orchestra after leaving The Royal, and became a "favorite of Maryland's high society". As bandleader of The Royal, Chambers was succeeded by the classically trained Tracy McCleary, whose band, the Royal Men of Rhythm, included Charlie Parker at one point. Many of The Royal's band members would join with touring acts when they came through Baltimore; many had day jobs in the defense industry during World War II, including McCleary himself. The shortage of musicians during the war led to a relaxation in some aspects of segregation, including in The Royal's band, which began hiring white musicians soon after the war. McCleary would be The Royal's last conductor, however, while Chambers' orchestra became a fixture in Baltimore, and came to include as many as thirty musicians, who would sometimes divide into smaller groups for performances. Chambers had collected many musicians from around the country, like Tee Loggins from Louisiana. Other performers with his Orchestra included trumpeter Roy McCoy, saxophonist Elmer Addison and guitarist Buster Brown, who was responsible for the Orchestra's most characteristic song, "They Cut Down That Old Pine Tree", which the Rivers Chambers Orchestra would continue to play for more than fifty years.

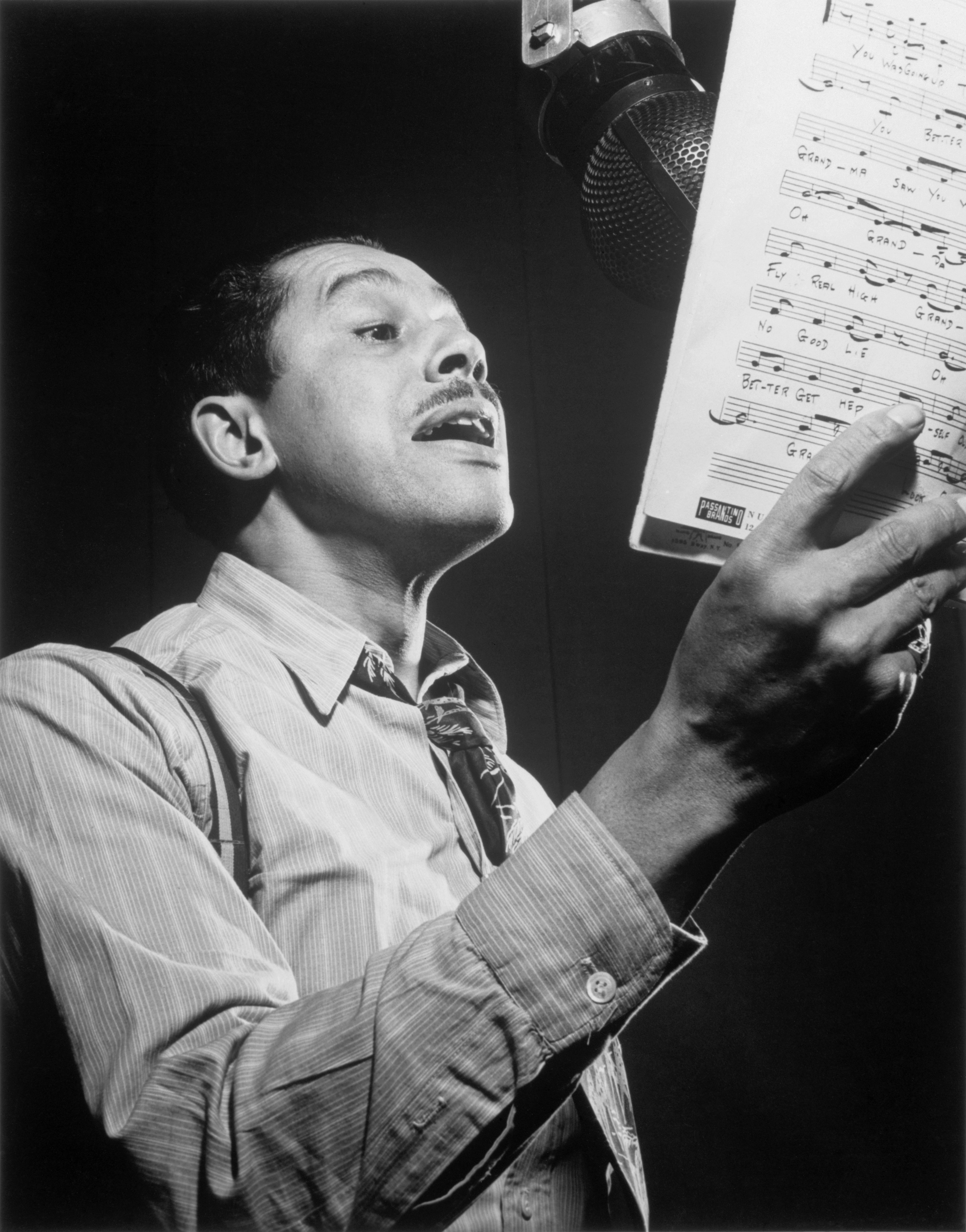
Cab Calloway

Baltimore's early jazz pioneers included Blanche Calloway, one of the first female jazz bandleaders in the United States, and sister to jazz legend Cab Calloway. Both the Calloways, like many of Baltimore's prominent black musicians, studied at Frederick Douglass High School with William Llewellyn Wilson, himself a renowned performer and conductor for the first African American symphony in Baltimore. Baltimore was also home to Chick Webb, one of jazz's most heralded drummers, who became a musical star despite being born hunchbacked and crippled at the age of five years. Later Baltimoreans in jazz include Elmer Snowden, and Ethel Ennis. After Pennsylvania Avenue declined in the 1950s, Baltimore's jazz scene changed. The Left Bank Jazz Society, an organization dedicated to promoting live jazz, began holding a weekly series of concerts in 1965, featuring the biggest names in the field, including Duke Ellington and John Coltrane. The tapes from these recordings became legendary within the jazz aficionados, but they did not begin to be released until 2000, due to legal complications.

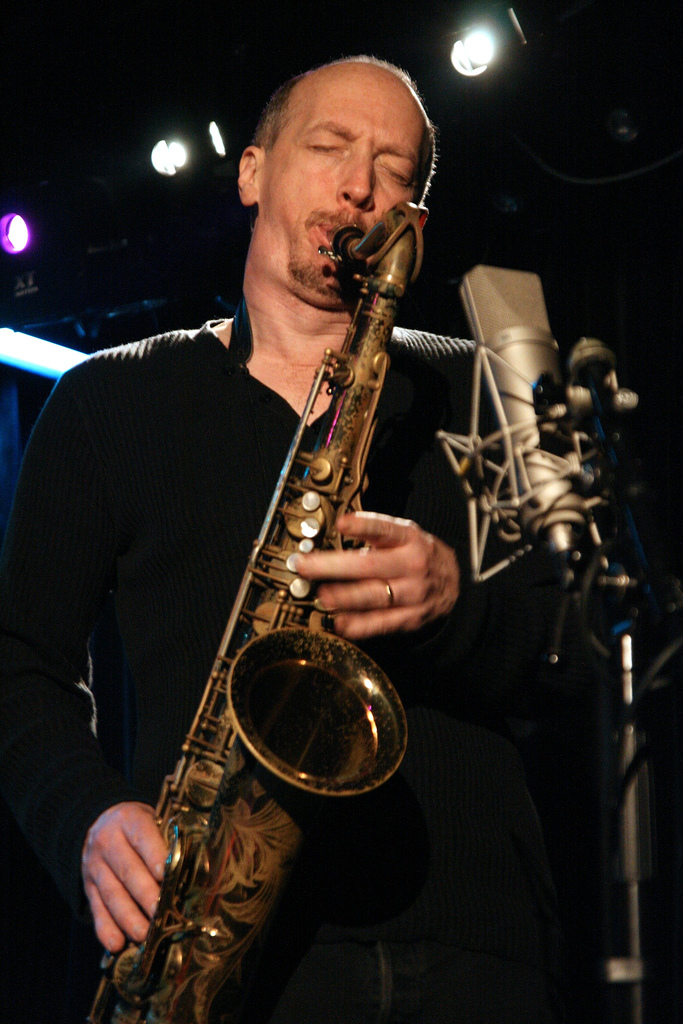
Ellery Eskelin

Baltimore is known for jazz saxophonists, having produced recent performers like Antonio Hart, Ellery Eskelin, Gary Bartz, Mark Gross, Harold Adams, Gary Thomas and Ron Diehl. The city's style combines the experimental and intellectual jazz of Philadelphia and elsewhere in the north with a more emotive and freeform Southern tradition. The earliest well-known Baltimore saxophonists include Arnold Sterling, Whit Williams, Andy Ennis, Brad Collins, Carlos Johnson, Vernon H. Wolst, Jr.; the most famous, however, was Mickey Fields. Fields got his start with a jump blues band, The Tilters, in the early 1950s, and his saxophone-playing became the most prominent part of the band's style. Despite a national reputation and opportunities, Fields refused to perform outside the region and remains a local legend.

In the 1960s, the Hammond B-3 organ became a critical part of the Baltimore jazz scene, led by virtuoso Jimmy Smith. The Left Bank Jazz Society also played a major role locally, hosting concerts and promoting performers. The popularity of jazz, however, declined greatly by the beginning of the 20th century, with an aging and shrinking audience, though the city continued producing local performers and hosting a vibrant jazz scene.

===== Doo wop =====
Baltimore in the middle of the 20th century was home to a major doo wop scene, which began with The Orioles, who are considered one of the first doo wop groups to record commercially. By the 1950s, Baltimore was home to numerous African American vocal groups, and talent scouts scoured the city for the next big stars. Many bands emerged from the city, including The Cardinals and The Plants. Some doo wop groups were connected with street gangs, and some members were active in both scenes, such as Johnny Page of The Marylanders. Competitive music and dance was a part of African American street gang culture, and with the success of some local groups, pressure mounted, leading to territorial rivalries among performers. Pennsylvania Avenue served as a rough boundary between East and West Baltimore, with the East producing The Swallows and The Cardinals, as well as The Sonnets, The Jollyjacks, The Honey Boys, The Magictones, and The Blentones, while the West was home to The Orioles and The Plants, as well as The Twilighters, and The Four Buddies.

It was The Orioles, however, who first developed the city's vocal harmony sound. Originally known as The Vibra-Naires, The Orioles were led by Sonny Til when they recorded "It's Too Soon to Know", their first hit and a song that is considered the first doo wop recording of any kind. Doo wop would go on to have a formative influence on the development of rock and roll, and The Orioles can be considered the earliest rock and roll band as a result. The Orioles would continue recording until 1954, launching hits like "In the Chapel in the Moonlight", "Tell Me So" and "Crying in the Chapel".

===== Soul =====
Baltimore is less well known for its soul music than other major African-American urban areas, such as Philadelphia. However, it was home to a number of soul record labels in the 1960s and 1970s, including Ru-Jac (born 1963), whose artists included Joe Quarterman, Arthur Conley, Gene & Eddie, Winfield Parker, The Caressors, Jessie Crawford, The Dynamic Corvettes, and Fred Martin. Soul venues in Baltimore in that period included The Royal and Carr's beach in Annapolis, one of the few beaches black people could use.

==== Punk, rock, metal and the modern scene ====
Though they rose to prominence in Boston and New York City respectively, new wave musicians Ric Ocasek and David Byrne are both natives of the Baltimore area. Frank Zappa, Tori Amos, Cass Elliot (The Mamas & the Papas), and Adam Duritz (Counting Crows vocalist) are also from Baltimore.

Notable Baltimore-area rock acts from the 1970s and 1980s include Crack The Sky, The Ravyns, Kix, Face Dancer, Jamie LaRitz, and DC Star.

Also, Epic recording Artist Tony Sciuto "Island Nights" who was also a member of Australia's Little River Band, Player and ABC Fullhouse's (Jesse and the Rippers) was raised in Medfield Heights (Hampden)area. Sciuto also has written songs for Tina Turner, Don Johnson, B.J Thomas and more.

Baltimore's hardcore punk scene has been overshadowed by that of Washington, D.C., but included locally renowned bands like Law & Order, Bollocks, OTR, and Fear of God; many of these bands played at bars like the Marble Bar, Terminal 406, and the illegal space Jules' Loft, which author Steven Blush described as the "apex of the Baltimore (hardcore) scene" in 1983 and 1984. The 1980s also saw the development of a local new wave scene led by the bands Ebeneezer & the Bludgeons, Thee Katatonix, The Vamps, AR-15, Alter Legion, and Null Set. Later in the decade, emo bands like Reptile House, and Grey March had some success and recorded with Ian MacKaye in DC.

Some early Baltimore punk musicians moved on to other local bands by the end of the 1990s, while local mainstays Lungfish and Fascist Fascist becoming regionally prominent. The Urbanite magazine has identified several major trends in local Baltimorean music, including the rise of psychedelic-folk singer-songwriters like Entrance and the house/hip hop dance fusion called Baltimore club, pioneered by DJs like Rod Lee. More recently, Baltimore's modern music scene has produced performers like Cass McCombs, Ponytail, Animal Collective, Spank Rock, Rye Rye, Double Dagger, Roomrunner, Mary Prankster, Beach House, Lower Dens, Future Islands, Wye Oak, The Seldon Plan, Dan Deacon, Ed Schrader's Music Beat, Dope Body, Rapdragons, Adventure, and JPEGMafia, many of whom are associated with the New Weird America movement, and thus is the city itself.

In 2009, Baltimore produced its own indigenous rock opera theatrical company, the all-volunteer Baltimore Rock Opera Society, which operates out of Charles Village. The group has so far put on two rock operas, one in 2009 and the other in 2011. They both have featured original scores.

The city's 2010s independent hip-hop scene also included rappers such as Kane Mayfield, who founded Mania Music Group in Baltimore and released albums including The Return of Rap (2015).

== Media and organizations ==
Baltimore's indigenous music media includes The City Paper, The Baltimore Sun, and Music Monthly, which frequently advertise local music shows and other events. The Baltimore Blues Society also distributes one of the more well renowned blues periodicals in the country. The Baltimore Afro-American, a local periodical, was one of the most important media in 20th-century Baltimore, and documented much of that city's African American musical life. Recently, a number of new media sites have risen to prominence including Aural States (Best Local Music Blog 2008), Government Names, Mobtown Shank and Beatbots (Best Online Arts Community 2007).

Baltimore is home to a number of non-profit music organization, most famously including the Left Bank Jazz Society, which hosts concerts and otherwise promotes jazz in Baltimore. Another organization to grace its way into the Baltimore scene is Vivre Musicale. The latter organization's mission is to give young artists performance opportunities in and out of Baltimore. These non-profits play a greater role in the city's musical life than similar organization do in most other American cities. The organization Jazz in Cool Places also works within that genre, presenting performers in architecturally significant locations, such as in a club full of Tiffany windows. The Society for the Preservation of American Roots Music also puts on jazz and blues concerts at its Roots Cafe.

== Venues ==
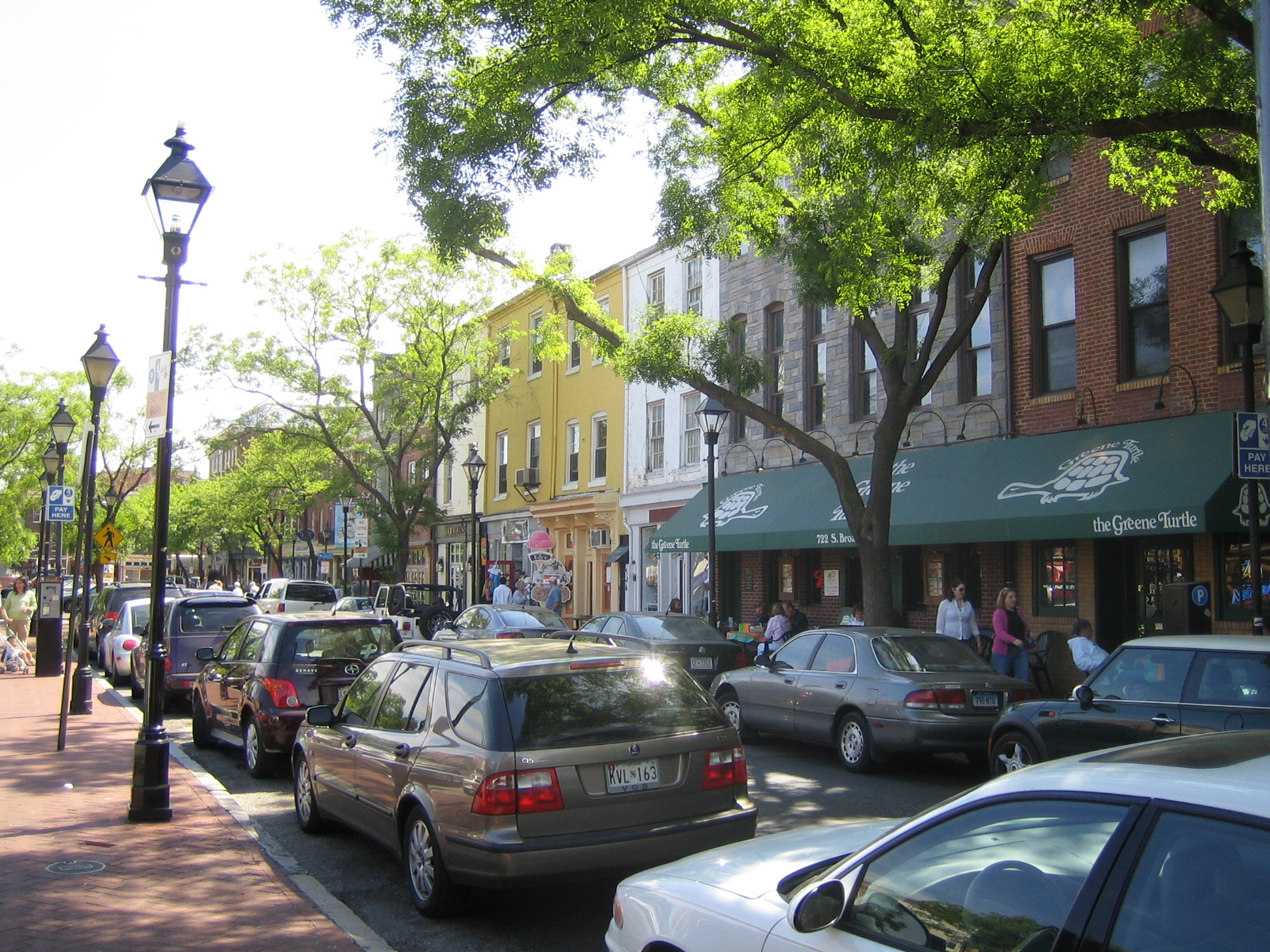
Fell's Point is an area home to many nightclubs and other music venues.

Many of Baltimore's nightclubs and other local music venues are in Fells Point and Federal Hill. One music field guide points to Fell's Point's Cat's Eye Pub, Full Moon Saloon, Fletcher's Bar, and Bertha's as particularly notable, in addition to a number of others, most famously including the Sportsmen's Lounge, which was a major jazz venue in the 1960s, when it was owned by football player Lenny Moore.

Many of the most legendary music venues in Baltimore have been shut down, including most of the shops, churches, bars and other destinations on the legendary Pennsylvania Avenue, center for the city's jazz scene. The Royal Theater, once one of the premiere destinations for African American performers on the East Coast, is marked only by a simple plaque, the theater itself having been demolished in 1971. A statue of Billie Holiday remains on Pennsylvania Avenue, however, between Lafayette and Lanvale, with a plaque that reads I don't think I'm singing. I feel like I am playing a horn. I try to improvise. What comes out is what I feel.

There are six major concert halls in Baltimore. The Lyric Opera House is modeled after the Concertgebouw, in Amsterdam, and was reopened after several years of renovations in 1982, the same year the Joseph Meyerhoff Symphony Hall opened. Designed by Pietro Belluschi, The Meyerhoff Symphony Hall is a permanent home for the Baltimore Symphony Orchestra. Belluschi also designed the Kraushaar Auditorium at Goucher College, which opened in 1962. The Joseph and Rebecca Meyerhoff Auditorium, located at the Baltimore Museum of Art, also opened in 1982, and hosts concerts by the Baltimore Chamber Music Society. Johns Hopkins University's Shriver Hall and the Peabody's Miriam A. Friedberg are also important concert venues, the latter being the oldest still in use.

== Education ==
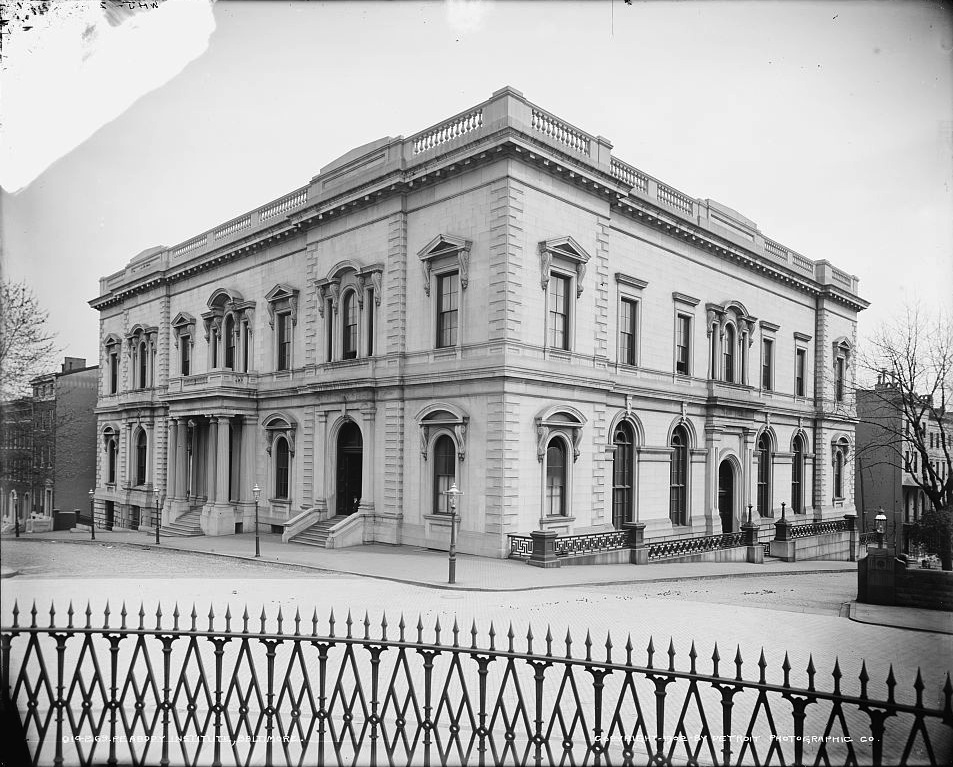
Peabody Institute, c. 1902

In the public school system of Baltimore city, music education is a part of each grade level to high school, at which point it becomes optional. Beginning in first grade, or approximately six years old, Baltimore students begin to learn about melody, harmony and rhythm, and are taught to echo short melodic and rhythmic patterns. They also begin to learn about different musical instruments and distinguish between different kinds of sounds and types of songs. As students progress through the grades, teachers go into more detail and require more proficiency in elementary musical techniques. Students perform rounds in second grade, for example, while movement (i.e. dance) enters the curriculum in third grade. Beginning in middle school in the sixth grade, students are taught to make mature aesthetic judgements, and to understand and respond to a variety of forms of music. In high school, students may choose to take courses in instrumentation or singing, and may be exposed to music in other areas of the curriculum, such as in theater or drama classes.

Public school instruction in music in Baltimore began in 1843. Prior to that, itinerant and professional singing masters were the dominant form of formal music education in the state. Music institutions like the Baltimore Symphony Orchestra sometimes have programs aimed at youth education, and other organizations have a similar focus. The Eubie Blake Center exists to promote African American culture, and music, to both youth and adults, through dance classes for all age groups, workshops, clinics, seminars and other programs.

=== Higher education ===
Baltimore's most famous institute of higher music education is the Peabody Institute's Conservatory of Music, founded in 1857 though instruction did not begin until 1868. The original grant from George Peabody funded an Academy of Music, which became the Conservatory in 1872. Lucien Southard was the first director of the Conservatory. In 1977, the Conservatory became affiliated with Johns Hopkins University.

The Baltimore region is home to other institutions of musical education, including Towson University, Goucher College, and Morgan State University, each of which both instruct and present concerts, Morgan State University, which offers Bachelor of Fine Arts and Master of Arts degrees in music, and Bowie State University, which offers undergraduate programs in music and music technology.

The Arthur Friedham Library collects primary sources relating to music in Baltimore, as do the archives maintained by the Peabody and the Maryland Historical Society. Johns Hopkins University is home to the Milton S. Eisenhower Library, whose Lester S. Levy Collection is one of the most important collections of American sheet music in the country, and contains more than 40,000 pieces, including original printings of works by Carrie Jacobs-Bond such as "A Perfect Day" (song).

== See also ==
- Maryland State Boychoir
- Greater Baltimore Youth Orchestra
- Mid-Atlantic Music Scene

== Works cited ==
- Baltimore City Public Schools (2009). "What Your Child Will Learn in Music". Learning at Home. Archived from the original on July 13, 2009.
- Bird, Christiane (2001). The Da Capo Jazz and Blues Lover's Guide to the U.S.. Da Capo Press. ISBN 0-306-81034-4.
- Floyd, Samuel A. (1995). The Power of Black Music: Interpreting Its History from Africa to the United States. Oxford University Press. ISBN 0-19-508235-4.
- Galkin, Elliott W.; N. Quist (2001). "Baltimore". In Stanley Sadie (ed.). New Grove Dictionary of Music and Musicians, Volume 2: Aristoxenus to Bax. New York: Macmillan Publishers. pp. 611–612. ISBN 0-333-60800-3.
- Ward, Brian (1998). Just My Soul Responding: Rhythm and Blues, Black Consciousness, and Race. University of California Press. ISBN 0-520-21298-3.
