= List of Maryland music groups =

This is a list of Maryland music groups, consisting of groups of Marylanders who are musically notable, musically notable groups of people with a connection to Maryland, and other groups who are notable within the music of Maryland. Groups listed may be relevant to the state of Maryland, the Province of Maryland or the area now known as Maryland before it was either a state or colony.

| Name | Notes | Reference | Image |
|---|---|---|---|
| Against Nature | Baltimore-based doom metal band, consisting of John Brenner, Bert Hall and Steve Branagan | | |
| Alcian Blue | Takoma Park based shoegaze/electro new wave band consisting of Sam Chintha, Jacob Reid, Kim Reid, Clark Stacy, and Matt Welsh. | | |
| All Time Low | Towson-based pop punk band, consisting of Alex Gaskarth, Jack Barakat, Zack Merrick and Rian Dawson | | |
| Animal Collective | Neo-psychedelia group originally from Baltimore | | |
| Annapolis Symphony Orchestra | Annapolis-based symphony | | |
| Arion Band | Community band based in Frostburg, established in 1877 | | |
| Bad Seed Rising | Hard rock band based in Frederick, established in 2012 | | |
| The Bakerton Group | Side project of Germantown-based stoner rock band Clutch | | |
| Ballyhoo! | An Aberdeen, Maryland based punk/pop/reggae band | | |
| Baltimore Chamber Orchestra | Chamber orchestra, based in Baltimore, led by Music Director Markand Thakar. | | |
| Baltimore Colored Symphony Orchestra | African American orchestra, founded by Charles L. Harris, from 1929 to 1939 | | |
| Baltimore Opera Company | Baltimore-based opera company | | |
| Baltimore Symphony Orchestra | Baltimore-based symphony | | |
| Baltimore's Marching Ravens | The official marching band of the Baltimore Ravens American football team. They were founded as the Baltimore Colts' Marching Band on September 7, 1947 and have continuously operated ever since, supporting three separate football franchises. | | |
| Beach House | Indie rock duo from Baltimore, consisting of Alex Scally and Victoria Legrand | | |
| The Blentones | African American vocal group from Baltimore | | |
| Braddock Heights | Blues Rock band from Frederick Maryland formed by Aidan and Zach Brown and their group of friends Nick Young, Aidan Twentey, Alex Harris, and Olivia Errera | | |
| The Braxtons | R&B group from Severn, consisting of Toni Braxton and her sisters | | |
| Breathing Walker | Emo band based in Annapolis, consisting originally of Jonathan Vance and Mark Laurence of Moss Icon, with Alex Badertscher, Zak Fusciello and Tim Horner, later adding Monica DiGalleonardo and Tonie Joy, both of Moss Icon | | |
| Brothers Osborne | Country music duo from Deale, Maryland. | | |
| The Buddies | African American vocal group from Baltimore, with Savoy Records, consisting of Leon "Larry" Harrison, who formed the group after the dissolution of The Four Buddies, with Roger Wainwright, Luther Dixon and Danny Ferguson | | |
| The Cardinals | African American vocal group from Baltimore, with Atlantic Records | | |
| Celebration | Baltimore-based rock band, consisting of Katrina Ford, Sean Antanaitis and David Bergander | | |
| Central Maryland Chorale | Vocal classical group, based in Laurel, and having evolved from the Laurel Oratorio Society | | |
| Channels | Baltimore-based rock band, consisting of J. Robbins, Darren Zentek and Janet Morgan | | |
| Clutch | Germantown-based metal band | | |
| Columbia Concert Band | Performance group based in Columbia | | |
| Columbia Jazz Band | Performance group based in Columbia | | |
| Credito | Indie/folk band based in Baltimore | | |
| Dan Deacon | Baltimore-based composer and electronic musician | | |
| Dog Fashion Disco | Rockville-based experimental band | | |
| Double Dagger | Baltimore-based rock band, consisting of Nolen Strals, Brian Dubin, Denny Bowen and Bruce Willen | | |
| Dying Fetus | Annapolis-based death metal band, currently consisting of John Gallagher, Sean Beasley and Trey Williams | | |
| Earthride | Maryland-based doom metal band, consisting of Dave Sherman, Kyle Van Steinberg, Rob Hampshire and Eric Little | | |
| End It | Baltimore-based hardcore punk band formed in 2017 known for energetic performances | | |
| Electric Brigade | Rock band with the United States Naval Academy Band | | |
| Fang | Baltimore-based hardcore punk band | | |
| The Four Buddies | African American vocal group from Baltimore, with Savoy Records, consisting of Leon "Larry" Harrison, William "Tommy" Carter, Vernon "Bert" Palmer and John "Gregory" Carroll, with the latter two replaced shortly before breaking up in 1953, by Alvin Bowen and Maurice Hicks. | | |
| Future Islands | Indie synthpop band from Baltimore signed to 4AD | | |
| Good Charlotte | Pop punk band originally from Waldorf, consisting of Joel and Benji Madden, Billy Martin, Paul Thomas and Dean Butterworth | | |
| The Greenberry Woods | Power pop band from the 1990s, consisting of Matt and Brandt Huseman, Ira Katz and Miles Rosen | | |
| Half Japanese | Punk band from Uniontown, consisting of Jad and David Fair, Mark Jickling and Ricky and John Dreyfuss | | |
| Handel Choir of Baltimore | Baltimore-based oratorio society that specializes in baroque, classical and early romantic music | | |
| Harmony Express Men's Chorus | 4-part a cappella men's chorus based in Germantown, Maryland. | | |
| Have Mercy | An American rock band from Baltimore, Maryland currently signed to Hopeless Records. | | |
| The Hidden Hand | Potomac-based doom metal band, led by Scott Weinrich with Matt Moulis and Bruce Falkinburg | | |
| Internal Void | Maryland-based doom metal band, consisting of J. D. Williams, Kelly Carmichael, Adam Heinzmann, and Mike Smail | | |
| IronChrist | Crossover speed metal/punk band, based in Annapolis, MD. Consisting of Ned Westrick, Tristan Lentz, Scott Truede and Mike Bullock. | | |
| Iron Man | Doom metal band, based in Maryland, led by Alfred Morris III | | |
| Jarflys | Side-project for Jimmie's Chicken Shack frontman Jimi Haha | | |
| Jimmie's Chicken Shack | Annapolis-based alternative rock band | | |
| John Ridgely Jazzers | First band to call its music jazz in Baltimore, led by John Ridgely, and also known as Ridgely 400 Society Jazz Band, with Lewis Flagg, John Tinner, Carlos Dowsy, Rivers Chambers and Alfred Hughes | | |
| Kix | Hagerstown-based metal band that had a gold single with "Don't Close Your Eyes" in 1988, consisting of Ronnie Younkins, Brian Forsythe, Donnie Purnell and Donnie Spence, and later Steve Whiteman and Jimmy Chalfant | | |
| Lake Trout | rock, ambient, jazz. | | |
| Laurel Oratorio Society | Classical group, founded in 1969, eventually became the Central Maryland Chorale. | | |
| Lungfish | Baltimore-area punk band, consisting of Daniel Higgs, Asa Osborne, Sean Meadows, Mitchell Feldstein, John Chriest and Nathan Bell | | |
| Maryland Classic Youth Orchestras | Organization that runs a harp ensemble, several chamber ensembles, two string orchestras and three full orchestras, constituting a total of five groups: the Chamber Strings (a string orchestra containing kids grade 4 through 6, founded in 1995), the Young Artists (a full orchestra containing kids grade 6 through 8), the Symphony (a full orchestra containing kids grade 7 through 9), the Philharmonic orchestra (a full orchestra containing kids grade 10 through 12), and the Sinfonia (Grades 10-12). | | |
| Maryland State Boychoir | One of the first boys' choir in Maryland, it is based in Baltimore. Founded in 1987 by Frank Cimino, and designated "Maryland's Official Goodwill Ambassadors" by Maryland Governor William Donald Schaefer, the choir is composed of approximately 150 choristers, ages 7 to 20, who come from a wide range of ethnic, socioeconomic, and religious backgrounds. They perform locally, nationally, and internationally. | | |
| The Marylanders | African American doo wop group | | |
| Misery Index | Baltimore-area deathgrind band, consisting of Jason Netherton, Sparky Voyles, Mark Kloeppel and Adam Jarvis | | |
| Moss Icon | Early emo band from Annapolis, consisting of Tonie Joy, Jonathan Vance, Monica DiGialleonardo, Mark Laurence, later including Alex Badertscher | | |
| The Obsessed | Potomac-based doom metal band, led by Scott Weinrich with Scott Reeder, Guy Pinhas, Greg Rogers, Mark Laue, Ed Gulli and Dale Crover | | |
| ...Of a Revolution (O.A.R.) | Jam band from Rockville, consisting of Marc Roberge, Chris Culos, Richard On, Benj Gershman, Jerry DePizzo, and Mikel Paris | | |
| The Orioles | Pioneering Baltimore-based doo wop group, consisting of Sonny Til (lead tenor), Alexander sharp (high tenor), George Nelson (baritone), Tommy Gaither (guitar) and Johnny Reed (double bass and bass vocals), originally known as The Vibranaires | | |
| The Peppermint Rainbow | Baltimore-based psychedelic band | | |
| Periphery | Progressive metal band from Bethesda, consisting of Misha "Bulb" Mansoor, Matt Halpern, Jake Bowen, Mark Holcomb, Adam "Nolly" Getgood, and Spencer Sotelo. | | |
| Pinkshift | 3 Piece Pop-Punk band from Baltimore, Maryland | | |
| The Plants | African American doo wop group, with J&S Records, from the mid-20th century, consisting of James Lawson (musician) (baritone), Thuman Thrower (bass), Steve McDowell (first tenor) and George Jackson (musician) (lead) | | |
| Polkadot Cadaver | Rockville-based experimental band, consisting of Todd Smith, Jasan Stepp and John Ensminger | | |
| Pride of Baltimore Chorus | Baltimore-based award-winning Sweet Adelines International Barbershop chorus. | | |
| Reptile House | Baltimore-based early emo band, consisting of Daniel Higgs and London May | | |
| Revelation | Maryland-based doom metal band, consisting of John Brenner, Bert Hall, Josh Hart, Andy Kremer, Mike Theiss, and Steve Branagan | | |
| Rivers Chambers Orchestra | Jazz band led by Rivers Chambers | | |
| Rohrersville Cornet Band | Rohrersville-based cornet band that claims to be the oldest community music organization in the | | |
| Royal Men of Rhythm | Tracy McCleary's band at The Royal in Baltimore | | [Scary Bare] Baltimore based punk band |
| The Skunks | Ska band from Hyattsville | | |
| Snail Mail | Indie rock solo project of Lindsey Jordan, raised in Ellicott City area | | |
| The Sonnets | African American vocal group from Baltimore | | |
| Susquehanna Symphony Orchestra | Symphony based in Harford County, founded in 1978 | | |
| Symphony Number One | Baltimore-based chamber orchestra devoted to works by emerging composers | | |
| The Swallows | African American doo wop group from Baltimore, consisting of Eddie Rich, Frederick Johnson, Herman "Junior" Denby, Norris "Bunky" Mack, and Earl Hurley in its most well-known incarnation | | |
| Tidal Wave | Rock band with the United States Naval Academy Band | | |
| The Track Record | Annapolis-area pop punk band, consisting of Michael Strackbein, Rob Elson, Hasani Martin and Rob Viti | | |
| Trapped Under Ice | Baltimore-based Hardcore punk band, consisting of Justice Tripp, Sam Trapkin, Brad Hyra, Jared Carman, and Brendan Yates. | | |
| Turnstile | Baltimore-based Hardcore punk band and Trapped Under Ice side project consisting of Brendan Yates, Babydick Franz, Daniel Fang, Brady Ebert, and Sean Cullen | | |
| United States Naval Academy Band | Band based at the United States Naval Academy in Annapolis | | |
| Unorthodox | Maryland-based doom metal band, consisting of Dale Flood, Gary Isom and Mark Ammen | | |
| Void | Punk band from Columbia, consisting of John Weiffenbach, Bubba Dupree, Chris Stover, and Sean Finnegan | | |
| Vigil | Alternative rock band from Baltimore, consisting of Jo Connor, Andy R, X Factor, and Gregg Maizel. Appeared on the A Nightmare on Elm Street 4: The Dream Master soundtrack | | Viseral Disgorge. Death Metal. Baltimore |
| War On Women | Co-ed, feminist hardcore punk band from Baltimore | | |
| The Whatnauts | American vocal soul group from Baltimore, Maryland founded in 1969 | | |
| Wretched | Maryland-based doom metal band, consisting of Dave Sherman, Jeff Parsons, Dale Flood, John Koutsioukis, Cougin, Gus Baslika and Mike Phillips | | |
| Wye Oak | Baltimore indie folk / folk-rock duo named in honor of the former state tree of Maryland | | |
| Yukon | Baltimore-based rock band, consisting of Sam Garrett, Nick Podgurski and Brad Smith | | |

== See also ==
- Music of Annapolis
