= Ruby Glover =

American jazz singer (1929–2007)

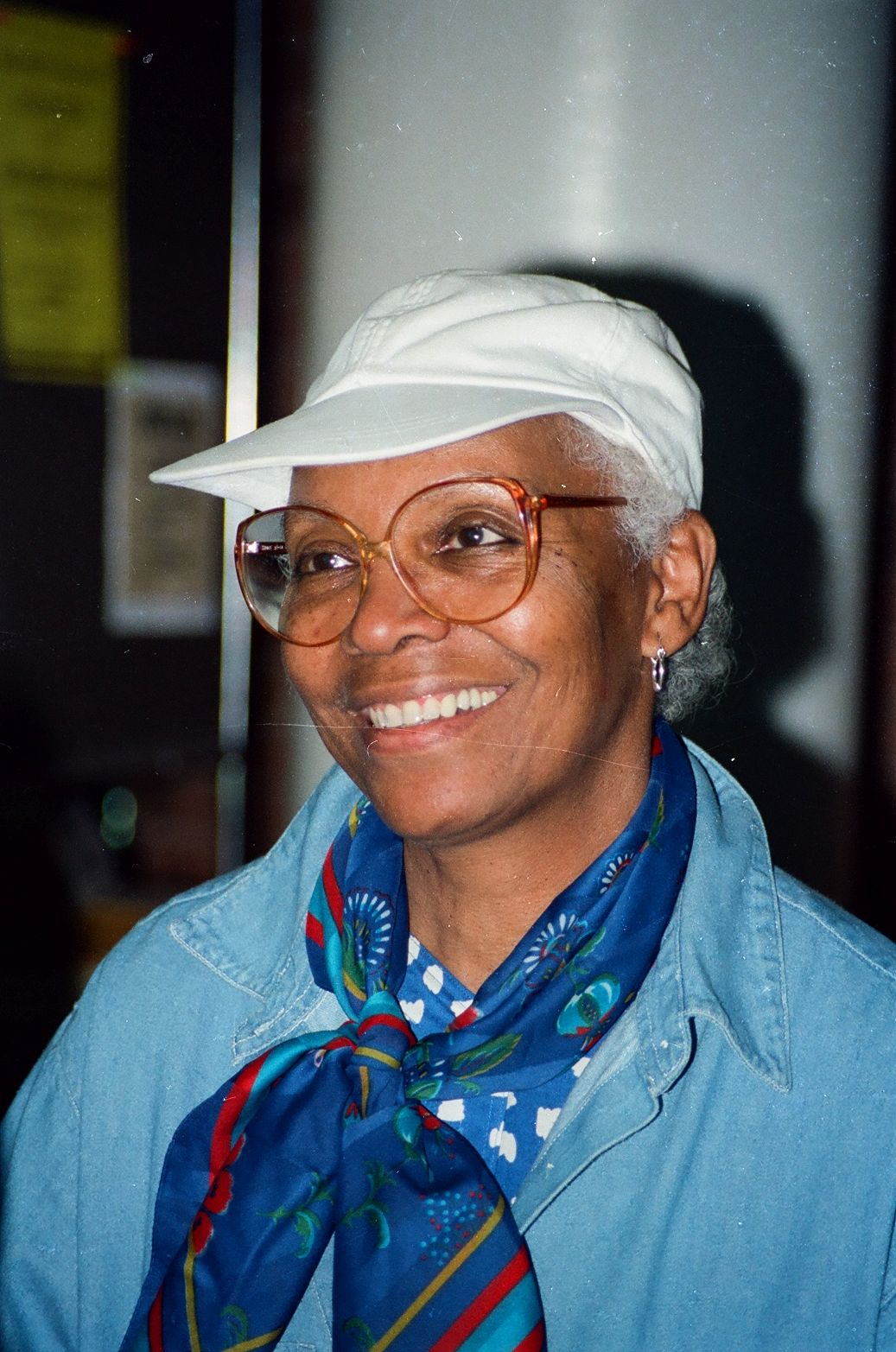
- Glover in 1996
- Born: Ruby Inez Jackson; December 6, 1928; Baltimore City, Maryland, U.S.
- Died: October 20, 2007; Baltimore City, Maryland, U.S.
- Other name: "Godmother of Jazz"
- Education: Dunbar High School
- Occupations: Jazz singer and educator

Ruby Glover (December 6, 1929 – October 20, 2007) was a jazz vocalist who was given the title "Godmother of Jazz" in 1993 by Baltimore mayor Kurt Schmoke. As a professor at Sojourner-Douglass College, she influenced many young students of her Baltimore community one among the many tributes to her honor was being heralded as "one of the greatest champions of jazz Baltimore has ever known". Among the many top musicians with whom she had shared the stage were Art Blakey, Sonny Stitt, Keter Betts, Andy Ennis, Charles Covington, Carlos Johnson, Whit Williams, Dennis Chambers, and Mickey Fields.

== Biography ==
Growing up in East Baltimore, Glover inherited her talents from her mother, Inez Edwards Bell, who was also a performer during the 1920s and 1930s. At the age of six, Ruby began singing at funerals for family members, and her career had begun by the time she entered Dunbar High School, where she sang with a sextet during the 1940s. She began singing at dances and talent contests, and became a local favorite in Pennsylvania Avenue's jazz clubs.

She took a break later on to focus on her family, raising five children. She returned to jazz during the 1960s. Throughout her life, she never forgot Baltimore and the importance of giving back. She taught jazz history at Sojourner-Douglass College and voice at Towson University, as well as starting the Billie Holiday Vocal Competition to encourage young artists.

Glover suffered a stroke on stage while performing at the East Baltimore's Creative Alliance on October 19, 2007, and died the following day, at the Johns Hopkins Bayview Medical Center, aged 77.
