= 12th Man =

The 12th Man or Twelfth Man can refer to:

- The 12th Man (album), the fourth studio album by American hip hop duo The High & Mighty
- 12th Man (film), a 2022 Indian Malayalam-language film
- 12th man (football), a term for fans of teams in eleven-a-side sports games
- 12th Man (Texas A&M), tradition at Texas A&M University regarding its football team
- Twelfth man (cricket), a cricket team's first substitute fielding player
- The Twelfth Man, a series of comedy productions by Australian satirist Billy Birmingham
- The 12th Man (film), a 2017 Norwegian film about saboteurs in World War II
