= Charles Tilghman =

Charles Tilghman may refer to:

- Charles Phillip Tilghman (1911–1988), American nightclub owner
- Charles F. Tilghman Jr. (1897–1985), American printer
