= Sphinx Club =

Sphinx Club may refer to:

- Sphinx Club (Baltimore), jazz club in Baltimore, USA
- Sphinx Club (New York), former gentlemen's club in New York City, USA
- Sphinx Club (Harvard College), former student club at Harvard, USA
