= Tracy McCleary =

Tracy McCleary (died 2003), was the leader of the Royal Men of Rhythm and a prominent part of the Baltimore jazz scene. The Royal Men of Rhythm was the house band at the Royal Theater, the premier African American music venue in Baltimore at that time. McCleary took the position from Rivers Chambers.
