= I Stumble as the Crow Flies =

EP by Reptile House
- Released: November 1985
- Recorded: March 1985
- Studio: Inner Ear Studios in Arlington, Virginia
- Genres: Punk rock, hardcore punk, post-hardcore
- Length: 12:04
- Labels: Dischord, Druid Hill
- Producer: Ian Mackaye

Reptile House chronology
I Stumble as the Crow Flies (1985)	Listen to the Powersoul (1988)

I Stumble as the Crow Flies is the first EP by the American punk band Reptile House. It was released in November 1985 through Dischord Records with the catalog number DIS 15.75 01. Drummer London May has likened the sound of the EP to the San Francisco punk/noise rock band Flipper, due to its mid-tempo rhythms and, noisy, jam-session sound. All songs were composed by Reptile House, with vocalist Daniel V. Strasser (later known as Daniel Higgs) writing the lyrics.

I Stumble as the Crow Flies has never been released on CD, but in 2010, producer Ian Mackaye and London May got together to re-issue the EP for its 25th anniversary. The re-issue was released on November 8, 2010.

== Track listing ==
No.	Title	Length
1.	"Keel-Haul Love"	3:16
2.	"Social Champion"	2:42
3.	"Mrs. Rain"	1:48
4.	"Sleestak Weather"	4:18
5.	"Lucas Slater"
Total length:		12:04

== Personnel ==
- Daniel V. Strasser – lead vocals
- Joe Goldsborough – guitar
- Leigh Panlilio – bass
- London May – drums

Production

- Ian Mackaye – producer
- Don Zientara – engineer
- Annie S., C. Jakab, D. McPherson – photography
