= Ike Dixon =

American music venue proprietor (1896–1953)

- Born: Isaiah Dixon; December 14, 1896; East Baltimore, Maryland, U.S.
- Died: January 6, 1953 (aged 56); Catonsville, Maryland, U.S.
- Resting place: Arbutus Memorial Park
- Occupations: Musician; club owner
- Spouse: Evelyn Phillips (m. 1915)
- Children: 3, including Isaiah

Isaiah "Ike" Dixon (December 14, 1896 – January 6, 1953) was an American musician and club owner. He was a major figure in the Baltimore jazz scene, as proprietor of the Comedy Club in that city, a major music venue that first opened in 1934 and was an after-show gathering place for many national figures who performed elsewhere in Baltimore.

== Early life ==
Isaiah Dixon was born on December 14, 1896, in East Baltimore, Maryland, to Annie (née Daniels) and Atney Dixon. He was educated in local public schools.

== Career ==
Dixon, who played the drums, piano and soprano saxophone, was the founder of a traveling jazz band, created in 1920, called the "Jazz Demons". According to Duke Ellington's autobiography Music is My Mistress, Dixon had the best band in Baltimore. The band went from show to show on a chartered bus and appeared on a local radio broadcast.

After retiring in 1934, he opened The Comedy Club in the former Savoy Ballroom, originally located at Mosher Street and Pennsylvania Avenue and later located at 1418 Pennsylvania Avenue in 1937 and at 1414 Pennsylvania Avenue in 1942. He remodeled the building after a fire in 1948. It became an important jazz venue, where many touring musicians gathered to party after their shows. In 1939, Dixon opened the Comedy Club Hotel, with 10 rooms above the club. The club received an A rating. Those whom the club hosted include Billie Holiday, Sammy Davis Jr., Dinah Washington, Miles Davis. Jackie "Moms" Mabley, Edward "Slappy" White, and Redd Foxx. He also ran the newspaper Dance Fan News. His real estate office handled more than US$500,000 in commercial and private properties.

== Personal life ==
Dixon married Evelyn Phillips on August 12, 1915. They had two sons, Howard and Isaiah Jr.. He also had another son, reverend Melvin Swann. His son Isaiah served in the Maryland House of Delegates. The family lived on Dolphin Street in Baltimore for more than 21 years before moving to their Old Frederick Road home in Catonsville in 1944.

Dixon died on January 6, 1953, at his home in Catonsville. He was buried in Arbutus Memorial Park. At the time of his death, his estate was stated as just over US$34,000, but the full estate was valued as over US$266,000.

== Legacy ==
After his death, the club was taken over and run until it closed in the 1960s by his sons, Howard and Isaiah.
