= Sound of Market =

Studio album by The High & Mighty
- Released: June 6, 2025
- Studio: The Muthafuckin' Spot On Lexington
- Genres: Hip-hop; Boom Bap; Pornocore
- Length: 54:25
- Label: Eastern Conference
- Producer: DJ Mighty Mi

The High & Mighty chronology
The 12th Man (2005)	Sound of Market (2025)

Sound of Market is the fifth studio album by American hip-hop duo The High & Mighty. It was released on June 6, 2025, via Eastern Conference Records, and was produced by DJ Mighty Mi. Released two decades after their previous studio album, The 12th Man, it features guest appearances from several hip-hop artists, including Cage, Kool Keith, Copywrite, The Alchemist and Sadat X.

== Album Concept ==
Sound of Market is an homage to Sound of Market Street, a legendary Philadelphia record store and area that the duo frequented as teenagers to buy records, sneakers, and apparel.

== Critical Reception ==
HipHopGoldenAge hail Sound of Market as the duo's best work since their debut, praising its refusal to chase modern trap trends and its sharp, punchline-heavy lyricism.

== Track listing ==
All music is composed by DJ Mighty Mi.

No.	Title	Length
1.	"Two Man Crew"	2:12
2.	"Zounds"	3:20
3.	"Pinky Tuskadero" (featuring Kool Keith)	3:44
4.	"Sixers & Squires" (featuring Skillz)	2:50
5.	"Super Sound" (featuring Breeze Brewin)	4:00
6.	"The Rose Bowl" (featuring The Alchemist and Your Old Droog)	4:15
7.	"Dubbs Up" (featuring King T)	3:25
8.	"Prism" (featuring Large Professor and Tash)	3:56
9.	"Mighty's Big 5 (Live From the Palestra)"	3:22
10.	"Most In-Outs" (featuring Cage)	4:07
11.	"I. Goldberg" (featuring MC Serch and Sadat X)	3:31
12.	"Funk 'O Mart" (featuring Chubb Rock)	4:14
13.	"Spaceport" (featuring Chill Rob G and Copywrite)	3:35
14.	"Highest Degree" (featuring O.C.)	3:19
15.	"Two High Whiteys"	4:35
Total length:		54:25

== Personnel ==
- Eric Meltzer – main artist, vocals
- Milo Berger – main artist, producer
- Keith Thornton – featured artist (track 3)
- Donny Lewis – featured artist (track 4)
- Paul Smith – featured artist (track 5)
- Alan Maman – featured artist (track 6)
- Dmitry Kutsenko – featured artist (track 6)
- Roger McBride – featured artist (track 7)
- William Mitchell – featured artist (track 8)
- Rico Smith – featured artist (track 8)
- Christian Palko – featured artist (track 10)
- Michael Berrin – featured artist (track 11)
- Derek Murphy – featured artist (track 11)
- Richard Simpson – featured artist (track 12)
- Robert Frazier – featured artist (track 13)
- Peter Nelson – featured artist (track 13)
- Omar Credle – featured artist (track 14)
