= Andy Ennis =

American jazz musician

- Born: March 7, 1938 (age 88); Baltimore, Maryland, U.S.
- Died: August 30, 2024 (aged 86)
- Genres: Jazz
- Instruments: Tenor saxophone
- Relatives: Ethel Ennis (sister)

Andy Ennis was an American tenor saxophone player, part of the Baltimore jazz scene. He began performing professionally in 1957, at the Royal Theatre. Ennis was a member of the Ray Charles Band and was briefly the leader.

He is the brother of Ethel Ennis, a well-known local singer and pianist.
