= Isaiah Dixon =

American politician (1922–2013)

Member of the Maryland House of Delegates from the 4th district (1967-1974), 38th district (1975-1982)
- In office 1967–1982 Serving with Lena King Lee (D), Larry Young (D)

Personal details
- Born: December 23, 1922 Baltimore, Maryland
- Died: April 26, 2013 (aged 90) Timonium, Maryland
- Party: Democratic
- Height: 5 ft 1 in (155 cm)
- Spouse: Miriam Dixon (m. 1947; died 2005)
- Children: Two children
- Education: Frederick Douglass High School, 1941; Howard University

Military service
- Branch/service: United States Army

Isaiah "Ike" Dixon Jr. (December 23, 1922 – April 26, 2013) was an American politician and businessman.

== Life ==
Dixon was born in Baltimore, Maryland and graduated from Frederick Douglas High School in 1941. He served in the United States Army and was stationed in El Paso, Texas. He then went to Howard University and was in the insurance, bail bonds, and real estate businesses.

He was first elected to the Maryland House of Delegates in 1966 as a Democrat. In 1972, he proposed that Harbor City Boulevard be named in honor of Dr. Martin Luther King Jr., a measure which was adopted a decade later. Other legislation that he was involved in included granting the Baltimore City mayor the power to appoint the police commissioner and a bill making cross-burning a felony. He served in the House of Delegates until 1982. After leaving the House, Mr. Dixon waged unsuccessful campaigns for the House of Delegates in 1986 and for the City Council in 1987.

Mr. Dixon was elected as a delegate to the 1976 Democratic National Convention. He served on the Greater Baltimore Board of Realtors Arbitration Panel and on the board of directors of the National Aquarium. He was also a member of the NAACP, receiving that organization's Certificate of Honor in 1970; and of Kappa Alpha Psi fraternity, which awarded him a Life Membership Certificate in 1992.

In 1978, Dixon attempted to introduce legislation in the Maryland state legislature to make it illegal to play Randy Newman's song "Short People" on the radio. He was advised by Attorney General Francis B. Burch that such a law would be a violation of the First Amendment.

His father was Ike Dixon who was a jazz musician and owner of the Comedy Club, a venue which showcased notable jazz singers. Isaiah Dixon and his brother Howard Dixon took over the management of the club after their father's death in 1953 until the club's closure in the 1960s.

He died in Timonium, Maryland and is buried at Arbutus Memorial Park, Arbutus, Maryland.
