= The 12th Man (album) =

Studio album by The High & Mighty
- Released: May 31, 2005
- Studio: The Muthafuckin' Spot On Lexington
- Genre: Hip Hop
- Length: 47:39
- Label: Eastern Conference
- Producer: DJ Mighty Mi

The High & Mighty chronology
| The Highlite Zone (2003) | The 12th Man (2005) | Sound of Market (2025) |

Professional ratings
Review scores
| Source | Rating |
|---|---|
| PopMatters | 7/10 stars |
| RapReviews | 8/10 stars |

The 12th Man is the fourth studio album by American hip hop duo The High & Mighty. It was released on May 31, 2005, via Eastern Conference Records and was produced entirely by DJ Mighty Mi. It featured guest appearances from Sean Price, Princess Superstar, Reef the Lost Cauze and Tame One.

== Track listing ==
All music is composed by DJ Mighty Mi.

| No. | Title | Length |
|---|---|---|
| 1. | "Garbage Time" | 2:22 |
| 2. | "Wonderama" | 4:08 |
| 3. | "Green Balloons" | 3:26 |
| 4. | "This Babylon" | 3:55 |
| 5. | "Star Destroyers" (featuring Sean Price) | 4:12 |
| 6. | "Outta Here" | 4:13 |
| 7. | "Damaged Goods" (featuring Reef the Lost Cauze) | 4:01 |
| 8. | "Bates" | 0:56 |
| 9. | "String Music" | 3:37 |
| 10. | "Barbershop Quartet" (featuring Tame One) | 4:03 |
| 11. | "Unholy Matrimony" (featuring Princess Superstar) | 4:24 |
| 12. | "Crack the Egg" (featuring Sean Price) | 4:09 |
| 13. | "Do It Yourself" | 0:47 |
| 14. | "Dumb" | 3:26 |
| Total length: | | 47:39 |

Sample credits

- Track 2 contains elements from "Sonnet" by Alla Pugachova
- Track 4 contains elements from "L'étrange Docteur Personne" by Caravelli
- Track 5 contains elements from "Change" by Face Dancer
- Track 10 contains elements from "Andiamo a Mietere Il Grano" by Louiselle

== Personnel ==
- Erik Meltzer – main artist, vocals
- Milo Berger – main artist, producer
- Sean Price – featured artist (tracks: 5, 12)
- Sharif Talib Lacey – featured artist (track 7)
- Rahem Brown – featured artist (track 10)
- Concetta Kirschner – featured artist (track 11)
- Joey Raia – mixing
- Michael Sarsfield – mastering
