= Harmony Express Men's Chorus =

Men chorus

Harmony Express
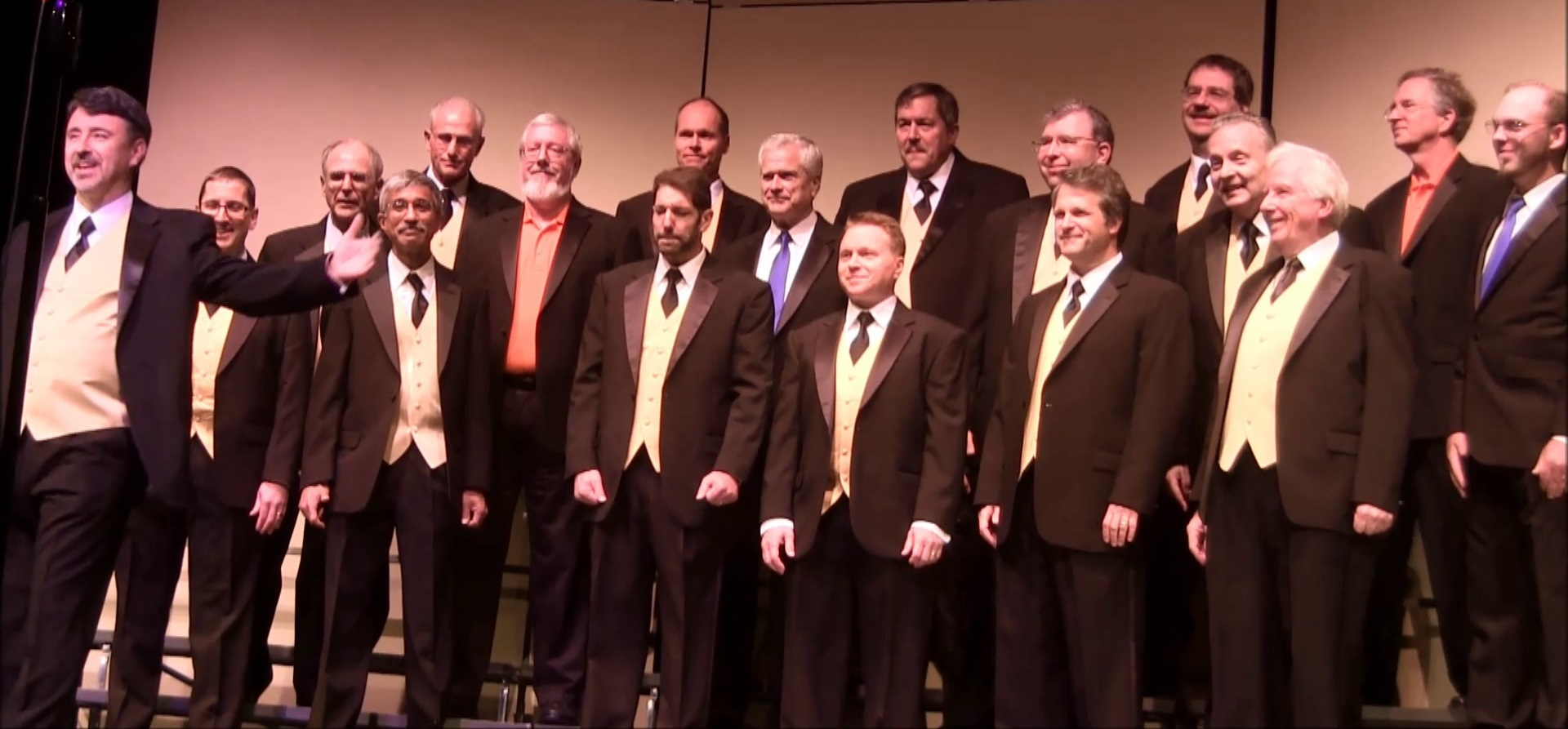
- Harmony Express at their annual show, 2015

Background information
- Origin: Germantown, Maryland United States
- Genres: A cappella, Choral, Barbershop
- Years active: 2008–present
- Members: Music Director: Frank Kirschner
- Website: Harmony-Express.org

Harmony Express is a 4-part a cappella chorus for both women and men based in Germantown, Maryland. The non-profit chorus is under the direction of Frank Kirschner as of 2017. It is the performing arm of the Germantown Chapter of the Barbershop Harmony Society. The chorus was featured in the documentary Barbershop Singing Old and New.

== History ==
On July 1, 2008, Mike Edison filed the Maryland Articles of Incorporation as president of the newly formed music group. That same year the Germantown, Maryland Chapter of the Barbershop Harmony Society was chartered by Edison and sponsored by the Montgomery County, MD Chapter (the Hometowne USA Chorus).

Harmony Express claimed their first Barbershop Harmony Society award in 2010 by becoming the AA plateau champion in their division. In 2011, they moved up to the AAA plateau and became the second place champion in the division. That same year they were also awarded "Most Improved Chorus" in the Southern Division.

== Performances ==
Harmony Express has performed at the F. Scott Fitzgerald Theatre, Montgomery County Agricultural Fair, Kentlands' Oktoberfest, Glenview Mansion, Celebrate Gaithersburg, Lakeforest Mall, Rio/Washingtonian Center, St. Rose of Lima Fiesta, and Leisure World. They have also been invited to host an a cappella showcase by the City of Gaithersburg. The chorus competes regularly, puts on an annual show, and serenades lovers on Valentine's Day.

== Quartets ==
Chapter quartets include The Glen Echoes and Handsome Reward. The Glen Echoes has performed The Star Spangled Banner eight times at Camden Yards for the Baltimore Orioles, including a July 2007 performance before a crowd of 40,000 people and a nationwide TV audience.

== Awards and recognition ==
- Invited three times to compete in the District contest (2010, 2011, 2012)
- 2010 Southern Division Plateau AA Champion
- 2011 Southern Division Most Improved Chorus
- 2011 Second Place Champion (Southern Division)

== See also ==
- A cappella music
- Choral music of Washington, D.C.
- List of Maryland music groups
- Barbershop music
- Barbershop Harmony Society
