= Mickey Fields =

American jazz saxophonist

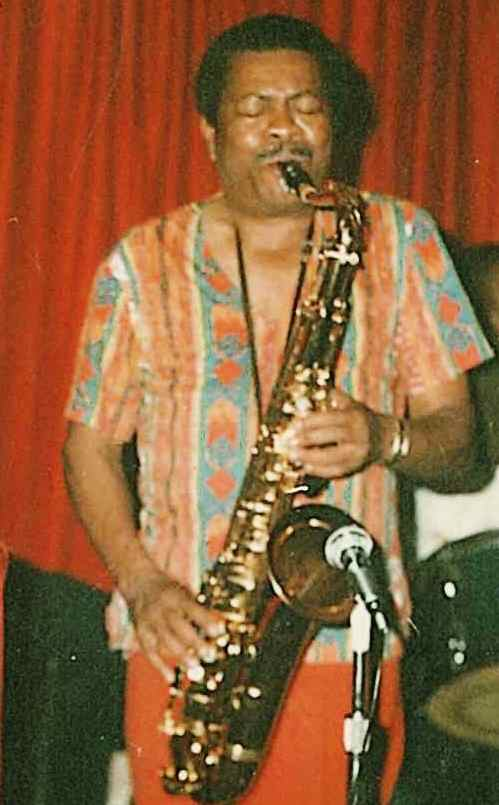
- Mickey Fields playing saxophone in the 1970s

Background information
- Born: Wilfred Fields; 1932–1933; Towson, Maryland, United States
- Died: January 16, 1995 Baltimore, Maryland
- Genre: Jazz
- Occupation: Saxophonist
- Instrument: Saxophone
- Years active: 1946–1995

Wilfred "Mickey" Fields (1932/33 – January 16, 1995) was a Baltimore-area jazz saxophonist, a local legend who refused to play outside the Baltimore area, although he was asked to leave Baltimore many times to go on the road with many famous bands.

He is recognized as one of Baltimore's most well-known jazz saxophonists and was a mentor to many other jazz musicians, including Paul H Brown. Mickey created the "Monday Night Jam Session" at the Sportsman's Lounge, which allowed many young up and coming jazz musicians to perform onstage with him. He was also known for his constant encouragement of young artists.

== Early life ==
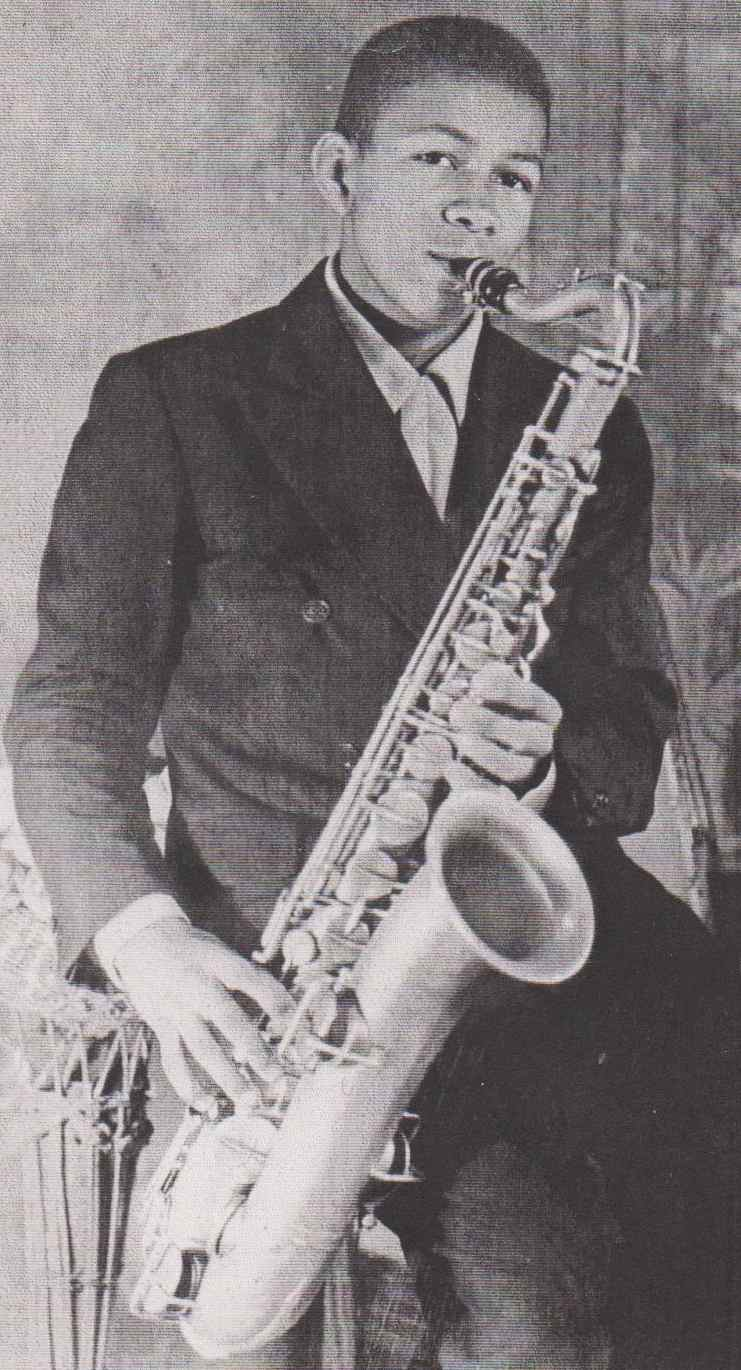
Mickey Fields at 14 years

Fields was born in 1932 to James and Etta Fields, in Towson, Maryland and was one of seven children. At an early age, Fields realized that he was naturally musically gifted. He had "perfect pitch" and was a self-taught musician, playing just about every instrument he could get his hands on.

At the age of 14, he taught himself how to play the saxophone. The story is that his older brother, Warren, won a saxophone in a crap game while heading back home aboard ship after WWII. When Mickey found it in the closet, he knew that was the instrument for him.

== Career ==
Fields began his career with the jump blues band The Tilters. As a solo artist, he recorded on Atlantic Records and Groove Merchant. Another member of the Tilters was Howard Earl Washington, a Baltimore-area jazz drummer. The Tilters played for the great Ethel Ennis. Fields later recorded several songs with his group "Mickey Fields and His Mice", entitled "The Cracker Jack", known as one of the top 100 funkiest songs ever and the popular "Little Green Apples".

He later recorded an album with the great Richard "Groove" Holmes, recorded at the Left Bank. Fields also performed with his sister, Shirley Fields, who was the lead singer for many years, and also a fixture in the jazz society in Baltimore.

== Personal life ==
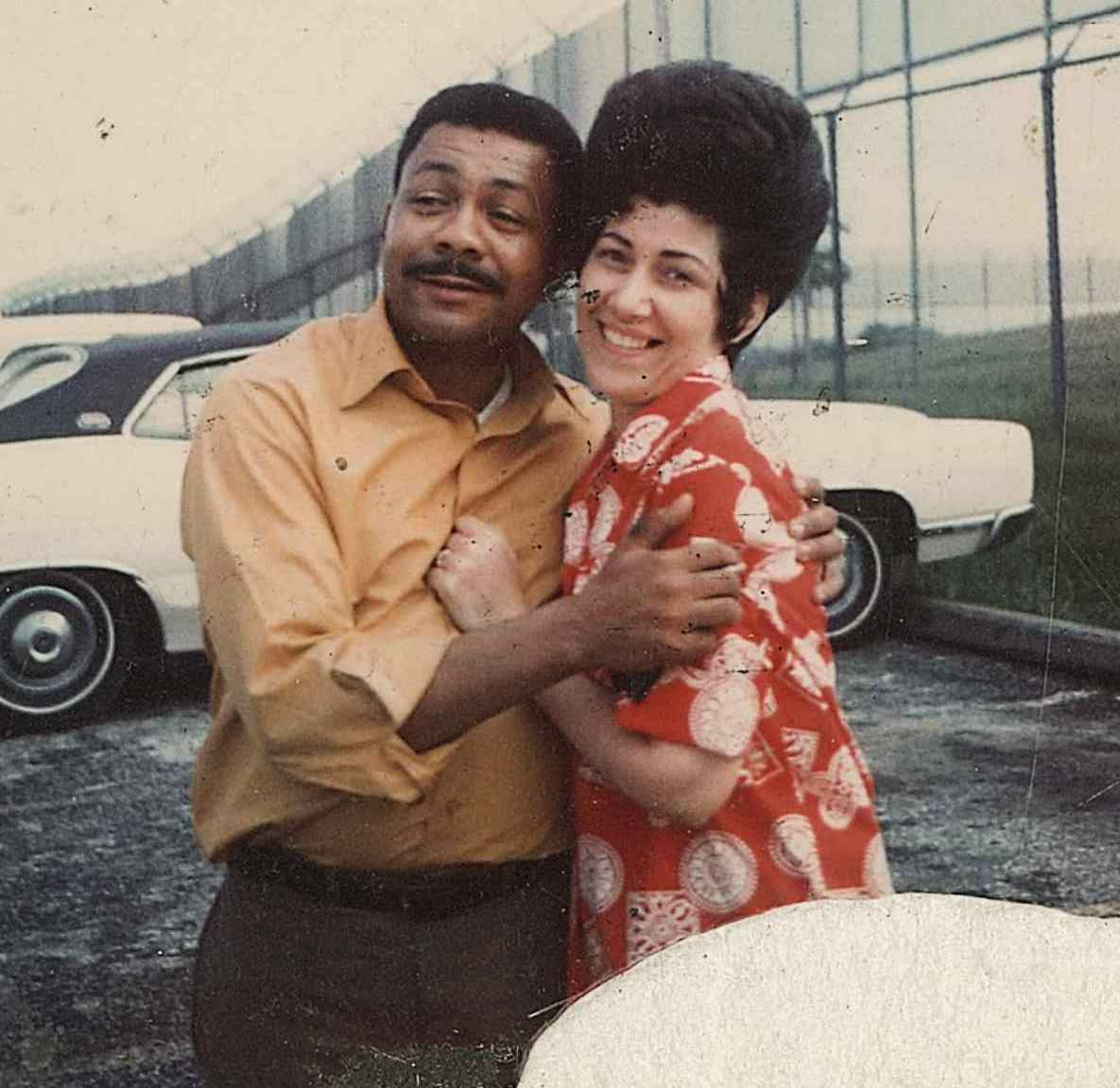
Mickey Fields and his wife Constance Fields

In the early 1950s Fields met Constance Wozniak while performing at a local jazz club. In 1956, Fields married Constance Wozniak and had two children, Michael and Jacqueline. Because it was illegal for African-Americans and Caucasians to marry in Maryland, they had to drive to Washington, D.C. to get married. In his later years, Fields suffered from severe gout which caused his hands to disfigure. But that never stopped him from playing his saxophone. He retrained himself to play with his deformity.

Fields continued to perform for his fans until he became very ill from kidney disease in October, 1994. He died at 62 on January 16, 1995 at Johns Hopkins Hospital in Baltimore, Maryland, the city he loved. His funeral was known as one of the largest funerals ever held for a local musician. He is survived by his widow Constance Fields, son Michael Fields, daughter Jacqueline Fields, granddaughter Danielle Fields and great-grandson Christopher Fields.

== Legacy ==
Fields was later inducted into the Great Blacks in Wax Museum in Baltimore, Maryland as a jazz saxophonist. Fields's musical influence still lives on today through his recordings and countless proteges in Baltimore and throughout the world.
