= Handel Choir of Baltimore =

American choir and oratorio society

- Choir
- Founded: 1935
- Genre: choir and oratorio
- Members: 50 singers
- Music director: Brian Bartoldus
- Choir admission: Audition
- Headquarters: 120 Allegheny Avenue, Towson, Maryland 21204
- Website: www.handelchoir.org

The Handel Choir of Baltimore is a choir and oratorio society based in Baltimore, Maryland, which has been performing since the 1930s. The ensemble is known for its annual performances of George Frideric Handel's Messiah, an unbroken tradition since 1935. During the tenure of Melinda O'Neal, Artistic Director and Conductor from 2004 to 2013, the Choir inaugurated the Handel Period Instrument Orchestra, an historically informed performance group. In 2007, the Handel Choir of Baltimore and the Handel Society of Dartmouth College commissioned a work by Jonathan Leshnoff which came to be known as Requiem for the Fallen. In February 2008, Handel Choir joined with the Baltimore Chamber Orchestra to present the premiere performance of the Requiem.

In 2013, O'Neal was succeeded by Arian Khaefi. Khaefi was also an assistant professor in the music department at Towson University and was the university's Director of Choral Activities. Khaefi stepped down in 2017 and was succeeded by Interim Artistic Director and Conductor Brian Bartoldus who lead the ensemble in 2017-2018 while the board of trustees conducted its search for a replacement. Bartoldus now serves as the permanent artistic director and conductor.
