= A. Jack Thomas =

American conductor

Alfred Jack Thomas (April 16, 1884 – April 19, 1962) was an American conductor from Baltimore, hired to work with the city's municipal music performance groups. He had also been one of the first African American bandleaders in the Army, and was director of the music department at Morgan College. He also founded the Aeolian Conservatory of Music in Baltimore.

Thomas later became the first African American to conduct the Baltimore Symphony Orchestra.

== Sources ==
- Schaaf, Elizabeth. "The Storm Is Passing Over". Peabody Institute. Archived from the original on December 14, 2012.
