= Carlos Johnson (saxophonist) =

American musician

Carlos Johnson is an alto saxophonist and singer who played a role in Baltimore jazz. Johnson's career began after joining the Bim Bam Boom Trio in the late 1960s, with Cornell Muldrow, an organist. He later worked with Damita Jo DuBlanc, Ella Fitzgerald, Roy Ayers, Lena Horne, Count Basie, Stevie Wonder, Ray Charles and Chuck Jackson.

In the 1980s, Johnson and his band worked an ongoing stint at Hazel's, a bar and restaurant in the Adams Morgan neighborhood of Washington, D.C., performing jazz and blues on the weekends. Since the closing of Hazel's in 1989, Johnson has stayed closer to home, playing engagements primarily in Baltimore.
