= Kane Mayfield =

American rapper, visual artist and author

- Kane Mayfield performing

Background information
- Born: Queens, New York, U.S.
- Origin: Baltimore, Maryland, U.S.
- Genre: Hip-hop
- Occupations: Rapper, visual artist, author, software developer
- Label: Mania Music Group
- Website: kanemayfield.com

Kane Mayfield (born Christopher Reid) is an American hip-hop artist, visual artist, and author from Long Island, New York, who rose to prominence in Baltimore, Maryland. After working in finance in New York, he relocated to Baltimore in 2005 and signed with the independent label Mania Music Group, releasing projects including Rhymes by Kane: Thievery Corporation Edition (2012) and his debut studio album The Return of Rap (2015). Beginning in 2021, he expanded into blockchain-based visual art and music on Counterparty and Bitcoin, releasing the albums DUST (2023) and Ides of March (2024).

== Early life ==
Mayfield was born in Queens, New York, and raised in Amityville on Long Island. He grew up in a Guyanese household, where reggae and dancehall were frequently played. Before pursuing music full-time, he worked as a stockbroker and mortgage broker in New York, moving to Baltimore in 2005.

== Career ==
=== Early work ===
Mayfield began writing rap lyrics as a teenager and performed in a group with his cousins. According to a 2012 profile in Quiet Lunch, an early production deal offered to the group excluded Mayfield, prompting him to take a job in financial services as a stockbroker while continuing to write rhymes in his spare time.

By 2008, Mayfield was recording in Baltimore with producer Headphones, releasing the EP Prelude to the Blade Runner and joining the independent label Mania Music Group. Mayfield later credited Headphones with teaching him how to structure his verses into full songs with hooks and bridges.

=== Baltimore hip-hop and The Return of Rap ===
Mania Music Group released Mayfield's collaboration with E Major, "UnHeard", in 2009, followed by the singles "Wreck" (2010) and "The Island" (2011). He released the project Follow MY Flow in 2011 and three volumes of Rhymes By Kane between 2012 and 2014.

In February 2012, The Baltimore Sun profiled Mayfield's work with Mania Music Group ahead of his appearance at a J Dilla tribute concert at the Ottobar, and later that year reviewed his single "Hydrants".

On July 24, 2012, Mania Music Group released the free nine-track mixtape Rhymes by Kane: Thievery Corporation Edition, on which Mayfield rapped over sampled tracks by the electronic duo Thievery Corporation. The next day, critic Brandon Soderberg named it Spin magazine's "Rap Release of the Week", highlighting its humor alongside political tracks such as "The Patriot", "Vampires", and "Ghetto Almenac". In November 2012, The Baltimore Sun included Mayfield in its cover story Rappers on the Rise, noting that members of Thievery Corporation had responded favorably to the mixtape, and later ranked his song "New Jack City" at number 16 on its year-end list of top Baltimore songs.

Mayfield drew on his former finance career for the video to his 2013 single "White Collar", which Quiet Lunch covered. In June 2014, The Baltimore Sun covered both his live session at Mobtown Studios and his three-part travelogue song for the A3C hip-hop festival.

A March 2015 Baltimore City Paper feature, Return on Investment, traced his move from Long Island to Baltimore in 2005, his work in finance, his transition to solo recording with Mania Music Group (founded in 2007), and the delayed production of his debut album The Return of Rap, noting autobiographical tracks such as "Beaches" and "Black Powder". In July 2015, Baltimore City Paper listed the album among its 50 recommended local releases from the first half of the year. That September, Mayfield performed a farewell concert at Baltimore's Metro Gallery before moving to Florida, an event previewed and photographed by The Baltimore Sun, before stepping back from regular live performances.

=== Digital art and later music ===
Mayfield began making blockchain-based digital art around 2021, crediting musician Rare Scrilla with introducing him to the medium. His visual work includes digital collages issued through the Counterparty-based Fake Rares project, combining AI-generated imagery with manual editing in Microsoft Paint.

He released the album DUST in 2023, produced by Street Scott with audio generated from Bitcoin blockchain data by RAD (Bitcoin Audio), alongside a companion release titled ELECTRUM. In 2024, he released Ides of March, a Bitcoin Ordinals music project paired with a browser-based sampling tool called Samplerr.

In 2024, he released the song "The Red Vineyard", named after Vincent van Gogh's painting of the same title, along with an accompanying video made by manually editing AI-generated images in Microsoft Paint. The release accompanied his Ethereum collection A Year & A Day and his Counterparty token LESXX.

== Writing and software ==
In April 2015, Baltimore City Paper published Mayfield's essay "Young and Black and Jaded", about his experience with racial profiling.

Mayfield later wrote the novel The Creature from Jekyll Island: Pepe Edition, a work of speculative fiction about monetary policy and Bitcoin that includes augmented-reality elements. He has also developed open-source cryptocurrency utilities, including the Counterparty metadata tool The Forge and the wallet-recovery tool Rescue Lifeboat, which received community crowdfunding through Giveth's 2026 Ethereum Security quadratic funding round.

== Selected discography ==
=== Albums and mixtapes ===
- Prelude to the Blade Runner (EP, 2008)
- Follow MY Flow (2011)
- Rhymes By Kane Vol.I (2012)
- Rhymes by Kane: Thievery Corporation Edition (mixtape, 2012)
- Rhymes By Kane Vol.II (2014)
- Rhymes By Kane Vol.III (2014)
- The Return of Rap (2015)
- DUST (2023)
- ELECTRUM (companion release)

=== Singles and collaborations ===
- "Wreck ’93" (2010)
- "The Island ’94" (2011)
- "Hello!" (2012)
- "UnHeard" (with E Major, 2009; single with alternate mixes)

=== Label compilations ===
- Mania Music Group Sampler '08 (2008)
- Mania Music Group Presents: Welcome To The Soundcheck (2010)
- Mania Music Group Presents – Welcome To The Audience (2010)

=== Guest appearances ===
Year	Song	Lead artist	Release
2014	"Day At a Time" (with Karron Johnson and Balance)	Greenspan	Strwy2Hvn
2015	"Lisbon"	Wendel Patrick	Travel
2024	"Polar Bear 2026 State Of Mind"	Rare Scrilla	42069

== Filmography ==
=== Music videos ===
Year	Title	Director / production	Notes
2010	"The Code"	Created using Animoto	From The Prelude to the Blade Runner (2008)
2012	"Hello!"	Daniel Hess / To Tony Productions	

=== Interviews ===
Year	Title	Details
2011	"Kane Mayfield (SXSW 2011)"	Interview at SXSW, Austin, Texas
2011	"Kane Mayfield Talks About Life in the Burbs"	Interview outside Joe Squared Pizza, Baltimore
2022	"Kane Mayfield Interview"	Interview with The Bee Shine

=== Short films ===
Year	Title	Credit
2013	Valentine's Day Rules: A Survivor's Guide to the Shakedown	Writer
