= Thomas Wall (theatre founder) =

Thomas Wall was the founder of the first permanent theatrical company in Baltimore, Maryland, the Maryland Company of Comedians, active from 1781 to 1785. It was founded, with Adam Lindsay, in spite of a 1774 ban by the Continental Congress on theatrical entertainment. Wall also built the New Theatre, the first theatre in Baltimore.
