= Reptile House =

American punk band (1983–1988)

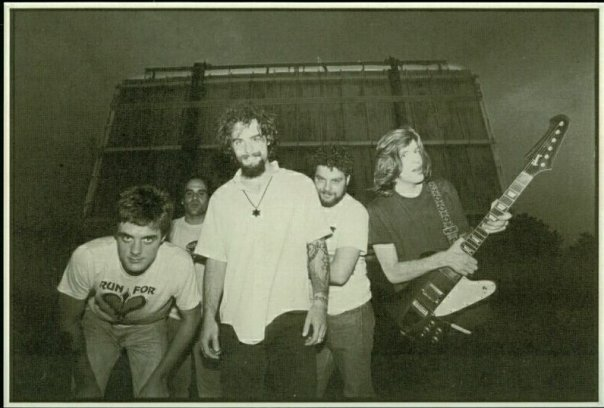

Background information
- Origin: Baltimore, Maryland, U.S.
- Genres: Post-punk, emo
- Years active: 1983–1988
- Labels: Dischord; Druid Hill; Merkin
- Past members: Daniel Higgs; Alex Layne; Joe Goldsborough; London May; Gary Breezee; David Rhodes; Leigh Panlilio; Asa Osborne

Reptile House was an 1980s American punk band from the Baltimore's music scene. The band included Daniel Higgs, later of Lungfish, guitarists Alex Layne, Asa Osborne and Joe Goldsborough, bass players David Rhodes and Leigh Panlilio, as well as drummers Gary Breezee and London May who went on to play in Glenn Danzig's post-Misfits band Samhain. They recorded the 7" I Stumble as the Crow Flies on Dischord Records with Washington D.C. hardcore pioneer Ian MacKaye and also released a full-length LP, Listen To The Powersoul, on the Baltimore label Merkin Records in fall 1988.

In 2010, guitarist Joe Goldsborough joined the band Gag School with drummer Kenny Sanders (formerly of Die Monster Die), multi- instrumentalist/ vocalist Ken Mosher (formerly of the Squirrel Nut Zippers), and bassist Joe LaVoie.

== Discography ==
=== Albums ===
- 1985: I Stumble as the Crow Flies EP, vinyl, 7"
- 1988: Listen to the Powersoul
