= Central Maryland Chorale =

Choral group based in Laurel, Maryland, US

The Central Maryland Chorale, formerly known as the Laurel Oratorio Society, is a classical music choral group based in Laurel, Maryland. The Laurel Oratorio Society was founded in 1969, and officially incorporated in 1973. The following year Virgil Thomson, a renowned conductor and composer, came to the Society to see a retrospective of his work.

The Central Maryland Chorale performs oratorios, musical excerpts, and lighter choral works approximately three times a year, in addition to its annual Christmas season sing-along of Handel's Messiah.

The chorale supports young artists each spring by providing a vocal scholarship competition. The competition is open to high school seniors between the ages of 16–19.

The Central Maryland Chorale conductor and artistic director is Monica Otal and is accompanied by Dr. Theodore Guerrant.
