= Adam Lindsay =

American theatre manager

Adam Lindsay, together with Thomas Wall, was a co-founder of the Maryland Company of Comedians, which was the first resident theatrical company in Baltimore, Maryland. It was founded in 1781. He owned a coffee house prior to working with Wall and returned to that profession after 1785.
