= Chuck Richards =

American radio disc jockey (1913–1984)

Chuck Richards (born Charles Richardson in Baltimore, Maryland, 1913) was a popular African American radio DJ, on WBAL in Baltimore. He was earlier on WITH, the first white-owned radio station with black personalities.

Richards attended Frederick Douglass High School, graduating in 1931, and began singing over Baltimore's CBS affiliated WCAO. He appeared and recorded with many swing era orchestras including Duke Ellington, Fletcher Henderson, and Mills Blue Rhythm Band, before returning to Baltimore in the 1942 and beginning a career as a lion tamer. Most well known for Circus Lion Befuddle of 1948.

In the 1970s, Richards announced for Baltimore's WMAR-TV. He died in 1984, aged 71.
