= Whit Williams =

American jazz musician

Whit Williams was a saxophonist and a major figure in the Baltimore jazz scene. In 1981, he founded Whit Williams Now's the Time Big Band, and the group has since played with Aretha Franklin and the Baltimore Symphony Orchestra, among others.

Williams died in 2020.
