= Maryland Company of Comedians =

The Maryland Company of Comedians was the first permanent theatrical company in Baltimore, Maryland, active from 1781 to 1785. It was founded, by Thomas Wall and Adam Lindsay, in spite of a 1774 ban by the Continental Congress on theatrical entertainment. Wall also built the New Theatre, the first theatre in Baltimore.
