= Face Dancer (band) =

American rock band

- Origin: Rhode Island
- Genre: Rock
- Years active: 1974–1982, 1990–present
- Label: Capitol Records
- Members: Billy Trainor; Jeff Adams; John West; PJ Lee; Charlie Thomas
- Past members: David Utter (d. 2019); Carey Kress (d. 2008); Scott McGinn; Michael Milsap; DJ Long (d. 2017); Tim Tanner; David Bell; BJ Weigman; Ronnie Zebron; Kevin "Spike" Settles; Michael Leigh; John Suchy (d. 2020); Danny Grim (d. 2019); Mark Roumelis

Face Dancer is an American rock group formed at the University of Rhode Island in 1972. They were most popular in the Baltimore/Washington D.C. region and released two albums on Capitol Records in the late 1970s and early 1980s.

Originally known in Rhode Island as Jack, Face Dancer was founded by Carey Kress, DJ Long, Mark Roumelis, Bob Mattera and Mike Bessette at the University of Rhode Island in 1972. They took their name from the shapeshifting creatures in Frank Herbert's novel Dune. Soon, the band relocated to Washington, D.C. where they met Scott McGinn. Originally, Face Dancer was a progressive rock band, but McGinn led the band to pursue more original songwriting and a new stylistic direction. The band's popularity as a live act in the mid-1970s led to a record deal with Capitol Records. In 1979, the band traveled to Los Angeles to record their debut album, entitled This World. The album was successful in the Baltimore/Washington region, but did not achieve larger commercial success.

In 1980, following pressure from Capitol, lead vocalist Carey Kress was replaced by Michael Milsap. The band traveled to England and recorded a second album, About Face, which was released in 1980. This album also failed to attract commercial success and after being dropped by Capitol, the band folded in 1982.

Face Dancer reunited in 1990 to record the album Midnite Raid, adding former Ravyns guitarist David Bell to the line-up. In 2003, a live album entitled Alive was released. In 2009, This World was released on CD by British reissue label Rock Candy Records. About Face still has not been reissued on CD. Face Dancer remained inactive until 2013, when a reunited version of the band featuring Kevin "Spike" Settles of Never Never on vocals performed a show in Edgewood, Maryland. Settles was later replaced by Michael Leigh. The reformed Face Dancer released a new album in 2016 titled Brave New Faces.

Lead singer Carey Kress was diagnosed with cancer in 2004 and died in 2009.

== Discography ==
Studio Albums

- This World (1979)
- About Face (1980)
- Midnite Raid (1990)
- Brave New Faces (2016)

Live Albums

- Alive (2003)
