= Charles Phillip Tilghman =

Charles Phillip Tilghman (April 29, 1911 - July 11, 1988) was the founder of the Sphinx Club, a major Baltimore jazz venue one of the first African American-owned nightclubs in the country. Tilghman ran the Sphinx Club until he died in 1988, and the Club shut down in 1992.
