= Rivers Chambers =

American jazz musician

Rivers Chambers was an American jazz musician. He was one of the major leaders in the jazz scene, part of the music of Baltimore. He was originally a pianist with John Ridgely, part of the first jazz band in Baltimore, and later led the house band at the Royal Theatre for many years. His Rivers Chambers Orchestra was a fixture on the Baltimore jazz scene for many years.
