= The Plants =

The Plants were an American doo wop quartet, based in Baltimore, Maryland, and formed in 1955. James Lawson (baritone), Thuman Thrower (bass), Steve McDowell (first tenor) and George Jackson (lead) constituted the original line-up, who were known as The Equadors. They got their break from Zell Sanders, owner of J&S Records, performing for her backstage at the Royal Theatre during a concert by The Moonglows. They released their debut, "Dear I Swear" in autumn of 1957, but it failed to achieve national success despite being a regional hit. They released another failed single in 1958, "From Me", after appearing on The Buddy Deane Show, a major musical venue in Baltimore at the time. A new lineup was assembled in 1958 by Zell Sanders, recording "I Searched the Seven Seas", while Jackson pursued a solo career, releasing a few singles during the 1960s.
