= Ethel Ennis =

American jazz singer (1932–2019)

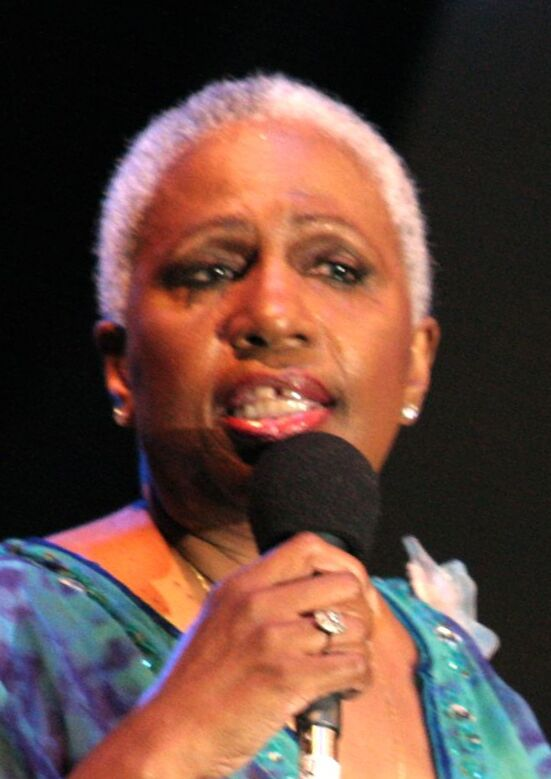
- Ennis at the 2007 Silver Spring Jazz Fest in Silver Spring, Maryland

Background information
- Born: Ethel Llewellyn Ennis; November 28, 1932; Baltimore, Maryland, U.S.
- Died: February 17, 2019 (aged 86) Baltimore, Maryland
- Genres: Vocal jazz
- Years active: 1955–2005

Ethel Llewellyn Ennis (November 28, 1932 – February 17, 2019) was an American jazz musician whose career spanned seven decades. Ennis spent the majority of her life in her hometown of Baltimore, Maryland, where she was affectionately known as the "First Lady of Jazz".

== Life and career ==
Ennis was born in a row house on North Calhoun Street in Baltimore, Maryland, and grew up in the Sandtown-Winchester neighborhood. She began performing as a church pianist at a young age.

Embarking on a solo singing career, she recorded a number of songs for Atlantic Records before her LP debut, Lullabies for Losers, was released by Jubilee Records in 1955. In 1957, she moved to Capitol Records for a two-album contract, and released A Change of Scenery. Soon after the 1958 follow-up LP Have You Forgotten, Ennis took a six-year hiatus from recording, during which she toured Europe with Benny Goodman. Two of her recordings 'Call Me Young' and 'Sing Me A tune' were used in the UK during Testcard intervals on BBC1 between January 1978 and April 1980.

In 1963, she recorded four LPs for RCA Victor. However, disenchanted with the creative direction of the label and artist management, Ennis left that label and took another hiatus. Eight years would pass before she received another recording contract. During this period she sang the title song for the 1967 feature film Mad Monster Party? The BASF LP 10 Sides of Ethel Ennis emerged in 1973; later that year, Ennis, a Democrat, was invited to sing at the inauguration of Richard Nixon. Her unusual a cappella rendition of the national anthem shocked some, but inspired many others. She later appeared on the panel game show To Tell the Truth and, after she stood up as "the Real Ethel Ennis," reprised her a capella rendition of the national anthem for the panelists and audience, receiving a standing ovation.

Ennis had by then returned to her hometown of Baltimore, and would sing outside the area only a handful of times in the ensuing decades. However, in 1980 she reappeared, releasing a live album, to the delight of her loyal fans. Ennis was brought back to national attention in 1994 with a self-titled NYC studio album produced by her long-time drummer, Paul Hildner. It reached the Jazz Top 40 radio chart. James Gavin of the New York Times wrote, "Her long, seductive 'Save the Best for Last' finds surprising depth in that Vanessa Williams hit, and she unlocks all the quiet wisdom of 'I Can Let Go Now,' Michael McDonald's ballad about the moment when the pain of a failed relationship ends. Mr. Gress, the pianists Stefan Scaggiari and Marc Copland, and the drummer Paul Hildner help give the album its stark, shadowy mood."

In 1998, Ennis once again recorded for a major label with If Women Ruled the World on Savoy Jazz. The most recent Ennis recording was a critically praised 2005 live set, captured in performance at Montpelier in her home state of Maryland.

Ennis died from a stroke on February 17, 2019. She was 86.

Ennis provided the speaking and singing voice for the character of Ethel Earphone on the Maryland Public Television children's show Book, Look and Listen during the mid-1970s.

== Discography ==
=== Albums ===
Year	Title	Chart positions	Label
Year	Title	US 200	Label
1955	Lullabies for Losers	—	Jubilee
1957	Change of Scenery	—	Capitol
1958	Have You Forgotten?	—	Capitol
1964	Once Again	—	RCA Victor
1964	This Is Ethel Ennis	147	RCA Victor
1964	Eyes for You	—	RCA Victor
1965	My Kind of Waltztime	—	RCA Victor
1973	God Bless the Child	—	RCA Camden
1973	10 Sides of Ethel Ennis	—	BASF
1980	Ethel: Live at the Maryland Inn	—	EnE
1994	Ethel Ennis	—	Hildner
1998	If Women Ruled the World	—	Savoy
2005	Ennis Anyone?	—	Jazzmont

=== Singles ===
- "A Pair of Fools/Got It in My Blood (To Love You)" (Atco)

Recorded in New York City on December 18, 1956.

- "I've got you under my skin/Off Shore" (Jubilee)
- "Boy from Ipanema/When Will the Hurt Be Over?" (RCA)
- "Now I Have Everything/Matchmaker Matchmaker" (RCA)
- "About Love/I've Got That Feeling" (RCA)
- "We Could Learn Together/Look at Me" (RCA)
- “For a little while/San Juan” (RCA)
- "I Believe in Love/I Wonder Who My Daddy Is" (BASF)
- "Call Me Young/Who Is It This Time?" (Spiral)
- "Sing Me a Tune/I Wonder Who My Daddy Is" (Spiral)

This listing is sourced from AllMusic and Discogs.

== Sources ==
- "Biography". Ethel Ennis. Allmusic.com.
