= Klemm (surname) =

Klemm is a German surname. Notable people with the surname include:

- Adrian Klemm (born 1977), American Football player
- Brian Klemm (born 1982), American musician with third wave ska band Suburban Legends
- Ekkehard Klemm (born 1958), German conductor
- Gustav Friedrich Klemm (1802–1867), German anthropologist and librarian
- Hanns Klemm (1885–1961), German aircraft pioneer and founder of the Klemm Leichtflugzeugbau GmbH (Klemm Light Aircraft Company)
- Hans G. Klemm (born 1957), United States diplomat
- Herbert Klemm (1903-1963), German lawyer, politician and SA-Oberführer
- Johann Conrad Klemm (1655–1717), German Lutheran theologian
- Jon Klemm (born 1970), Canadian ice hockey player
- Matthias Klemm (born 1941), German graphic designer
- Richard Klemm (1902–1988), German cellist, composer and teacher
- Richard O. Klemm (1932–2010), American businessman and politician
- Rudolf Klemm (1918–1989), German pilot during WWII
- Walther Klemm (1883–1957), German painter, printmaker, and illustrator
- Werner Klemm (1909–1990), Romanian-German ornithologist

== See also ==
- Klem (disambiguation)
- Klemme (disambiguation)
