= Clem (name) =

Clem is both a given name, often a short form (hypocorism) of Clement or other, similar names, a nickname and a surname. Notable people with the name include:

== Given name or nickname ==
=== In sports ===
- Clement Clem Calnan (1888–1974), English cricketer
- Clement Clem Clemens (1886–1967), Major League Baseball catcher
- Clem Crabtree (1918–1981), American football player and military officer
- Clem Crowe (1904–1983), American college football and basketball player, college football and basketball head coach and professional football head coach
- Clem Curtis (1940–2017), Trinidadian-born British singer born Curtis Clements
- Clemon Clem Daniels (1937–2019), American college and professional football player
- Clemens Clem Dreisewerd (1916–2001), Major League Baseball pitcher
- Clem Eischen (1926–2020), American middle-distance runner
- Clem Goonan (born 1939), former Australian rules footballer
- Clem Haskins (born 1943), American college and National Basketball Association player and college basketball head coach
- Clemens Clem Hausmann (1919–1972), Major League Baseball pitcher
- Clement Clem Hill (1877–1945), Australian cricketer
- Clement Clem Kennedy (1921–2010), Australian rugby league player
- Clement Clem Labine (1926–2007), American Major League Baseball relief pitcher
- Clement Clem Loughlin (1894–1977), Canadian hockey player
- Charles Clem McCarthy (1882–1962), American sportscaster and public address announcer
- Clem Michael (born 1976), former Australian rules footballer
- Clement Clem Neacy (1898–1968), American National Football League player
- Clem Smith (footballer) (born 1996), Australian rules footballer
- Clement Clem Splatt (1899–1963), Australian rules footballer
- Clement Clem Stephenson (1890–1961), English footballer
- Clement Clem Stralka (1913–1994), American National Football League player
- Richard Clement Clem Thomas (1929–1996), Welsh rugby union footballer
- Clem Turner (1945–2009), American National Football League and Canadian Football League player
- Clement Clem Wilson (1875–1944), English cricketer

=== In politics and government ===
- Clement Attlee (1883–1967), British Prime Minister
- Clement Clem Balanoff (born 1953), American politician
- Clement Clem Campbell (born 1948), Australian politician
- Clement Clem S. Clarke (1897–1967), American oilman and politician
- Arthur Clarence Clem Hawke (1898–1989), General Secretary of the Australian Labor Party in South Australia, father of former Prime Minister Bob Hawke
- Clem Jones (1918–2007), Australian politician
- Clem McSpadden (1925–2008), American politician
- Clement V. Rogers (1839–1911), Cherokee senator and judge in Indian Territory
- Clement Clem L. Shaver (1867–1954), American politician
- Clement Clem Simich (born 1939), New Zealand politician
- Clem Smith (politician), member of the Missouri House of Representatives since 2011

=== In arts and entertainment ===
- Clement Clem Beauchamp (1892–1992), American film actor, producer and director
- Clem Bevans (1879–1963), American character actor
- Clement Clem Burke (1954–2025), American rock drummer
- Clemente Clem Cattini (born 1937), English drummer
- Clement Clem Christesen (1911–2003), Australian literary critic
- David Clem Clempson (born 1949), English rock guitarist
- Clement Clem De Rosa (1925–2011), American jazz drummer, composer, arranger, band leader and music educator
- Clem Schouwenaars (1932–1993), Belgian writer
- Clem Seecharan (21st century), Guyanese writer
- Clem Tholet (1948–2004), Rhodesian folk singer

=== In fiction ===
- Clem, a fictional character in Warframe.
- Clem (Clémentine) Boissier, the main character of the TV series, played by Lucie Lucas.
- Clem (Buffy the Vampire Slayer), a character in the television series Buffy the Vampire Slayer.
- Clem Kadiddlehopper, a character played by comedian Red Skelton.
- A character in the Firesign Theater's I Think We're All Bozos on This Bus album.
- Clem Fandango, a character in the British television series Toast of London.

=== Other ===
- Clement Bezold, American political scientist, futurologist
- Clem Coetzee (c. 1939 – 2006), Zimbabwean conservationist
- Steve "Clem" Grogan (born 1951), American convicted murderer and former member of The Manson Family
- Clements Clem Sohn (1910–1937), American airshow daredevil
- Clement Clem Tisdell (1939–2022), Australian economist

== Surname ==
- Brian Clem (born 1972), American politician
- Chester Clem (born 1937), American politician
- Chloe Clem (born 2010), known for her concerned-looking reaction, which became a popular Internet meme in 2013
- George I. Clem (1910–1988), American politician
- Gordon Clem (1909–1970), Australian cricketer
- John Clem (1851–1937), United States Army general
- Mary Clem (1905–1979), American mathematician and human computer
- Mitch Clem (born 1982), American cartoonist

== See also ==
- Klem, a surname
