= Poltringen Airfield =

Poltringen Airfield Flugplatz Poltringen
- IATA: none; ICAO: EDSP

Summary
- Airport type: private
- Operator: Aviation Clubs Ammerbuch, Herrenberg and Unterjesingen
- Location: Poltringen, Germany
- Elevation AMSL: 401 m / 1,316 ft
- Coordinates: 48°32′49″N 8°56′41″E
- Interactive map of Poltringen Airfield

Runways
Direction	Length		Surface
Direction	m	ft	Surface
18/36	400	1,312	Asphalt
15/33	800	2,624	Grass

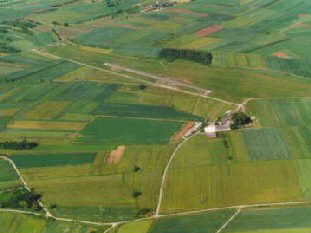
Poltringen Airfield

Poltringen Airfield is a private airfield located in Poltringen, which belongs to the town of Ammerbuch, Germany. It is located 9 kilometres (5.6 mi) west of Tübingen and 31 kilometres (19 mi) southwest of Stuttgart. It is only open to airplanes and gliders of the aviation clubs Ammerbuch, Herrenberg and Unterjesingen. Exceptions must be approved by the administration of the Tübingen region.

The airfield traffic pattern for airplanes is west of the airfield at 2700 ft.
