= Ammer (Neckar) =

River in Germany

- End near Lustnau
- Location of mouth in Baden-Württemberg

Location
- Country: Germany

Physical characteristics
- Mouth
  - location: Neckar
  - coordinates: 48.5839°N 8.85361°E
- Length: 22.6 km (14.0 mi)

Basin features
- Progression: Neckar→ Rhine→ North Sea

The Ammer (German pronunciation: [ˈamɐ]) is a small river in Baden-Württemberg, Germany, a tributary of the Neckar.

It has its source southwest of Herrenberg. Along the southern edge of the Schönbuch, it flows through Herrenberg, Ammerbuch, Unterjesingen and Tübingen, before it discharges into the Neckar at Tübingen-Lustnau after 22.6 kilometres (14.0 mi).

== Geography ==
=== Course ===
Origin of the Ammer are Ammer springs in the upper valley five spring pots southwest of Herrenberg in the district of Böblingen. From there the Ammer flows through the valley named after it at the southern edge of the Schönbuch nature park as well as the communities Gültstein and Ammerbuch, uniting in Tübingen with the Goldersbach and flows a little later in the Tübingen district Lustnau from the left into the upper Neckar. On its way of 22,5 km the Ammer falls about 94 meters.

The Ammer river crosses the villages Gültstein (Herrenberg), Altingen, Reusten, Poltringen, Pfäffingen (all Ammerbuch), Unterjesingen (Tübingen), the hamlet Ammern (Tübingen) and Tübingen.

=== Hydrological spring branch ===
Just 260 m after the Ammer leaves its main spring, the year-round Aischbach flows to it from the left, which has already flowed for more than four kilometres and usually carries more water than the Ammer. Hydrologically speaking, it is therefore the main source arm of the Ammer.

The Aischbach is water-bearing all year round from the time it passes under the embankment of the Stuttgart–Horb railway near Herrenberg station. Above the railway embankment the water flow is unstable. Several ditches converge there, draining in particular the northern and western area around Herrenberg and still beginning in the community areas of Jettingen and Mötzingen in the west. Their stream valleys were formed very early in geological history; today, however, these ditches only carry water temporarily after heavy rainfall.

=== Ammer Channel ===
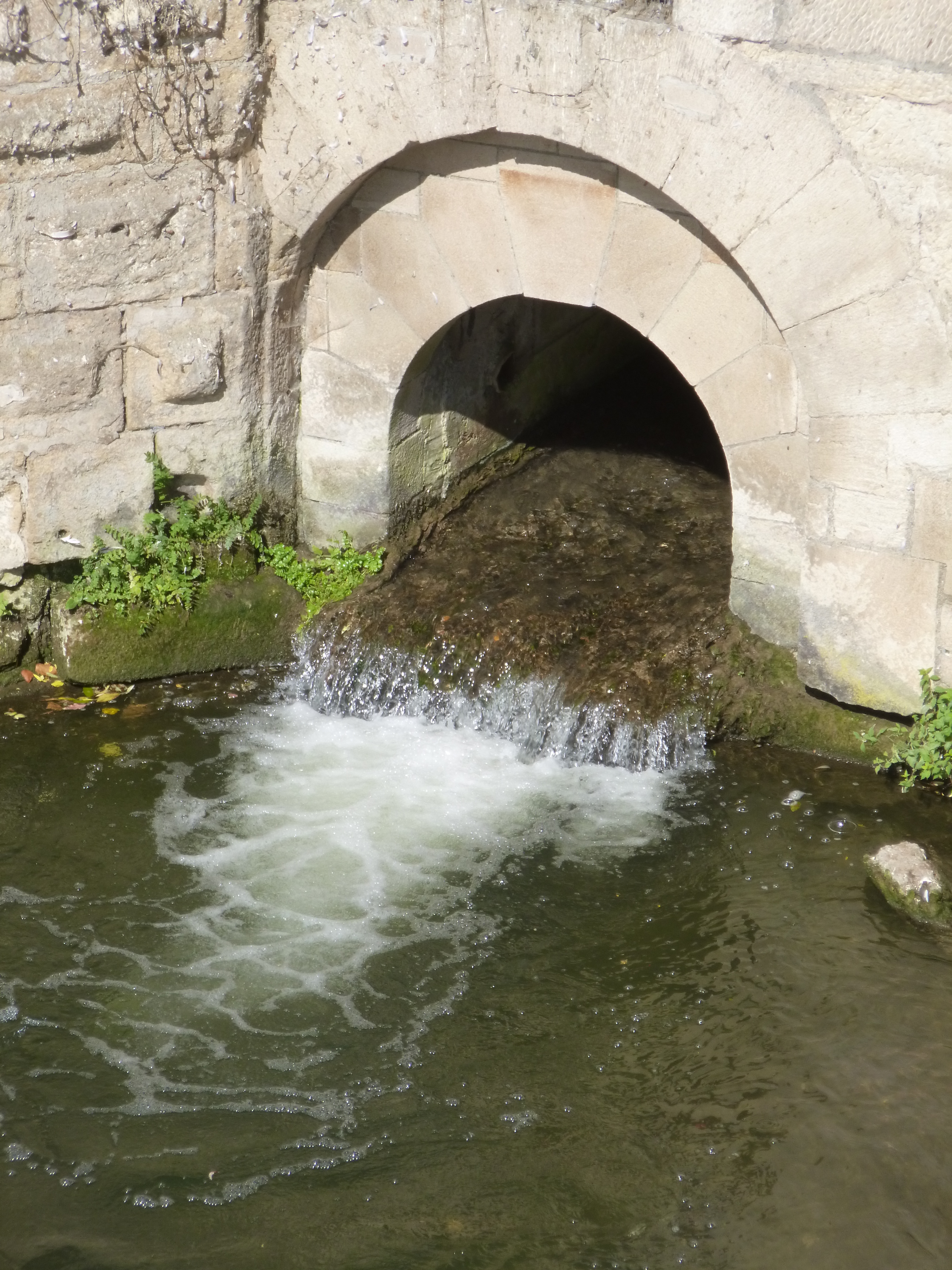
Ammerkanalmündung into the Neckar at the Neckar Bridge

Since 1493 the Ammer Canal branches off to the right at the Ammerhof, at here called Neue Ammer, which at first flows parallel to the river towards Tübingen. While the Ammer itself only touches the medieval city limits of Tübingen on its northern side, the Ammer Canal, also popularly called Stadtammer, flows through the Old Town, before it divides again at the Nonnenhaus and flows in two underground canals, one on the southern edge of the Old Botanical Garden back into the Ammer, the other under Mühlstraße into the Neckar. The Ammer canal was formerly used to drive various mills and for the copper hammer.

=== Tributaries ===
Listed from the source to the mouth.

Official origin of the Ammer southwest of Herrenberg from several sources in the Leiblesgrube.

- Aischbach, from the left southwest of Herrenberg, 4,3 km and 17,3 km^{2}. (The Ammer itself has here only 0,3 km length and a catchment area of 0,1 km^{2}.)
- Buchengraben, from the right at the second Ammer mill, 5,7 km and 3,9 km^{2}.
- Gutleuthaustalgraben, from the left before the third Ammermühle, 2,0 km.
- "Klettentalgraben", from the right after the third Ammermühle, 2,0 km.
- Metzelbrunnengraben, from the right between the Kochmühle and the Gültsteinmühle into the right side mill channel of the Kochmühle, 0,8 km.
- Meisenbrunnengraben, from the right after the sports ground south of Herrenberg-Gültstein, 0,8 km.
- "Salzgraben", from left south of Gültstein at the sawmill, 2,1 km.
- Fließgraben, from the right from the floodplain into the right mill canal Altingen at Ammerbuch-Altingen, 0,6 km.
- Schmalbach, from the right in Altingen into the side ditch, 5,2 km and about 11,7 km^{2}.
- Metergraben, from left at the northern edge of Ammerbuch-Reusten, 2,0 km.
- Kochhart (Femininum, also: Kochhartgraben, Kochenhartgraben or Enzgraben), from the right in southern Reusten, 15.6 km and 46.5 km^{2}. <LUBW-FG10: 15,585, LUBW-GEZG: 46,477 -->
- Türlesbach, from left between Reusten and Ammerbuch-Poltringen, 1,2 km. flows through a 1,8 ha< shortly before the mouth of the river LUBW-SG10: 1,81 --> large lake (full former quarry).
- Basermannsgraben, from the right in Poltringen, 1,9 km.
- Engwiesenbach, from the right at the end of Poltringen, 1,4 km.
- Käsbach, from left in Ammerbuch-Pfäffingen, 6,1 km and 15,5 km^{2}.
- Sulzbach, from the right through Pfäffingen, 0,8 km.
- Enzbach, from left at Tübingen-Unterjesingen, 2,1 km and 2,2 km^{2}.
- exit of the Ammerkanal, to the right at the domain Ammern below Unterjesingen
- "Landgraben," from the right into the "Ammerkanal" from the wide floodplain opposite Unterjesingen just after its exit, 2,5 km.
- Himbachgraben, from the left only a little before the next one, 0.4 km.
- Himbach, from left between Unterjesingen and Tübingen, 4,3 km and 4,4 km^{2}.
- Weilerbach, according to LUBW-FG10, matching in record entry and as map label there. However, a settlement road along the course of the stream is called Am Weilersbach. from left to Tübingen-Weststadt, 3,9 km and 4,9 km^{2}.
- Connecting canal Ammerkanal-Ammer, from the right in Tübingen-Weststadt, 0.2 km.
- stream from the Hellerloch, from the right in Tübingen-Weststadt into the Ammer Canal, 0.9 km.
- Aischbach (not Aischbach but another river with the same name), from the left in Tübingen, 1,1 km and 0,5 km^{2}. Almost completely tolerated, at last under the Aischbachstraße
- Käsenbach, from left in the old botanical garden, 2,5 km and 2,7 km^{2}.
- Return of the Ammer Canal, from the right at the western edge of the Old Botanical Garden, 4,6 km.
- Iglersbach, from left

== See also ==
- List of rivers of Baden-Württemberg
