= Kochhart =

River in Germany

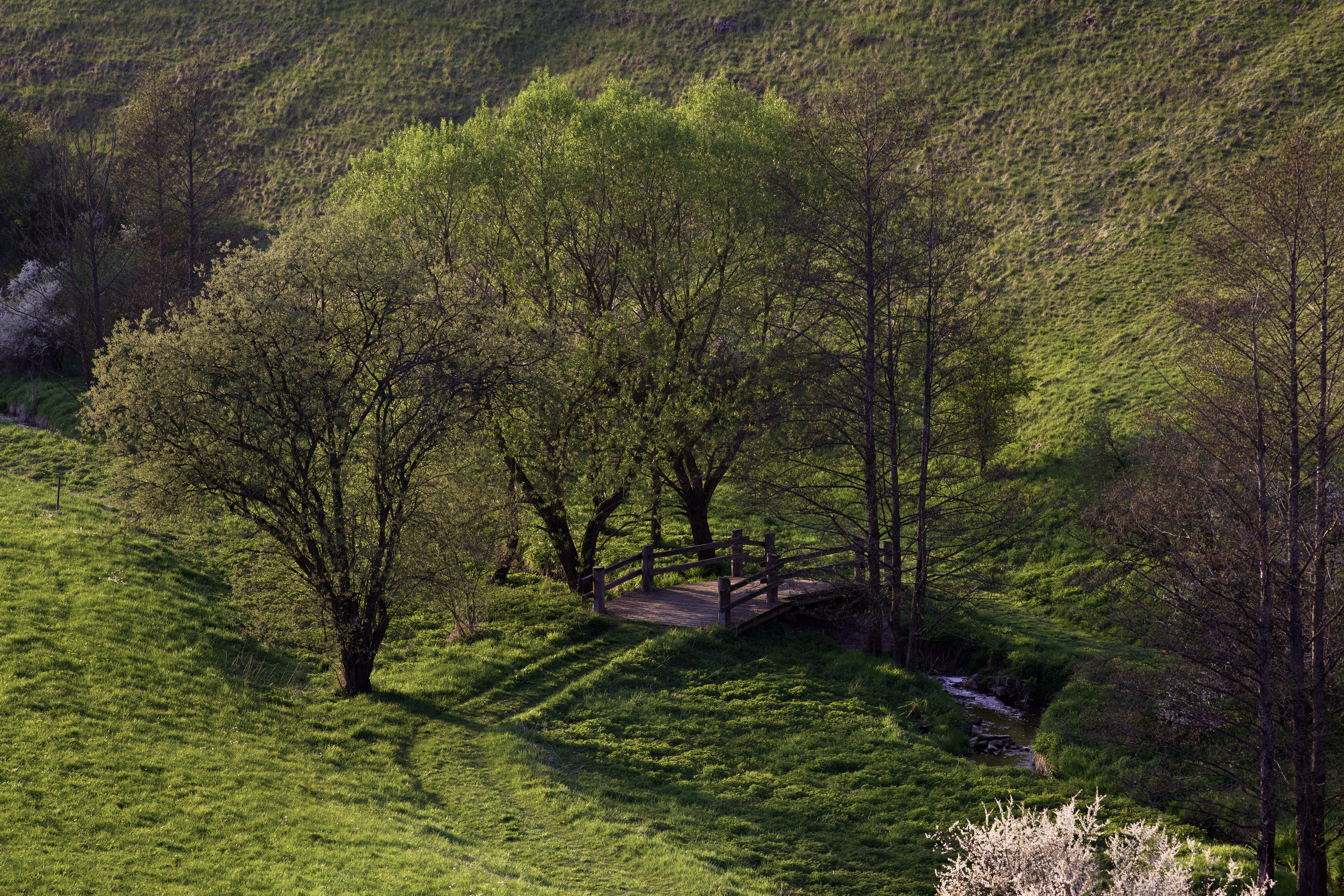

Location
- Country: Germany
- State: Baden-Württemberg

Physical characteristics
- Mouth: Ammer
  - coordinates: 48.5405°N 8.9222°E

Basin features
- Progression: Ammer→ Neckar→ Rhine→ North Sea

Kochhart is a river near Tübingen, Baden-Württemberg, Germany. The small river eroded a valley, which is a Naturschutzgebiet for geological and biological reasons. It flows into the Ammer near Ammerbuch.

The Kochhart is the longest tributary of the Ammer, a tributary of the Neckar, with a main length of almost 16 kilometers in central Baden-Württemberg. It is also referred to as Kochhartgraben or Kochenhartgraben and flows in a southeast to east-northeast direction before entering the Ammer from the right in Reusten. The valley in the lower course of the Kochhart is also called Kochhartgraben; it is part of the nature reserve Kochhartgraben and Ammertalhänge.

== Geography ==
=== Course ===
The Kochhart flows at the northern edge of the municipality of Bondorf, originating from its officially recognized main upper course, the Tiefenschleipf, and its right tributary, the Haldengraben. The Tiefenschleipf begins between Oberjettingen and Unterjettingen, initially flowing east, then for a longer stretch southeast, and finally receiving the intermittent Zigeunerbrünnle from the right, coming from the northern edge of Mötzingen. After 7 km, it merges with the shorter Haldengraben, which originates at the southern edge of Mötzingen and flows predominantly in an east-northeast direction.

From that point, the Kochhart flows southeast to east-northeast through the municipality of Bondorf, then transitions into the area of Hailfingen, where it passes north of the village itself and reaches Reusten, where it flows into the Ammer.

Notably, the lower section of the Kochhart near Reusten features a terrain incision approximately fifty meters deep, with a stream, rocks, and calcareous dry grassland, designated as a nature reserve covering 107 hectares. The nature reserve "Kochhartgraben and Ammertalhänge" consists of eight sections, with the Kochhartgraben occupying the largest area.

== Geology ==
The valley of the Kochhart is mostly a dry valley because the local upper shell limestone is very eroded. It was found that the water that sinks into the karst usually flows to the Bronnbach spring, which is located above Rottenburg am Neckar at the edge of the Neckar valley. In the lower part of the Kochhart, connections to springs near Reusten have also been found, and in the upper part near Jettingen, water from a spring south of Herrenberg sinks into the ground.

The area that drains into the Kochhart is in the rain shadow of the Black Forest and receives just under 700 mm of rain each year, making it one of the drier areas in Baden-Württemberg. The stream, fed by several springs in the Lettenkeuper rock, gradually sinks into the ground near Hailfingen. According to reports from 1923, there was no surface water flowing over the boundary to Reusten at that time. Today, during dry weather, 400 to 600 cubic meters of water per day flow from the sewage treatment plant for the Rottenburg district of Hailfingen and the municipality of Bondorf. A significant portion of this water sinks into the ground, but the stream no longer completely dries up further down the valley.

The Ammer and Kochhart rivers have cut deeply into a layer of shell limestone at Reusten, creating the Kochhartgraben. Both streams cut through an area called the Reustener Saddle, which rose about five million years ago in the Pliocene era. At that time, the Swabian Jura and the Black Forest also rose, and the Ammer and Kochhart likely flowed along their current paths. The ground rose slowly enough for them to carve into the rock without having to change their course.

At the end of the Kochhartgraben, there is a narrow point called Kirchberg, which is about 500 meters long and located above Reusten. It is named after a church that used to be near the cemetery on the hill. This spot is at the center of an oval shell limestone saddle that is two to four kilometers in diameter, and from there, there is a good view into the two canyons that the Ammer and Kochhart have cut into the land.
