= Clem =

Clem may refer to:

== Places ==
- Clem, Oregon, United States, an unincorporated community
- Clem, West Virginia, United States, an unincorporated community
- Clem Nunatak, a nunatak in the Ross Dependency, Antarctica

== Other uses ==
- Clem (hill), a categorisation of British hills
- Clem (horse), an American Thoroughbred racehorse active in the 1950s
- Clem (name), a list of people with the given name, nickname or surname
- Clem (TV series), a French TV series
- Clem., author abbreviation for the plant ecologist Frederic Clements
- Correlative Light-Electron Microscopy (CLEM)
- Clem, another name for the character in Kilroy was here graffiti

== See also ==
- Clems, California, a ghost town
- Clementine (disambiguation)
- Klem, a surname (includes a list of people with the name)
