= Kim Kulig =

German footballer

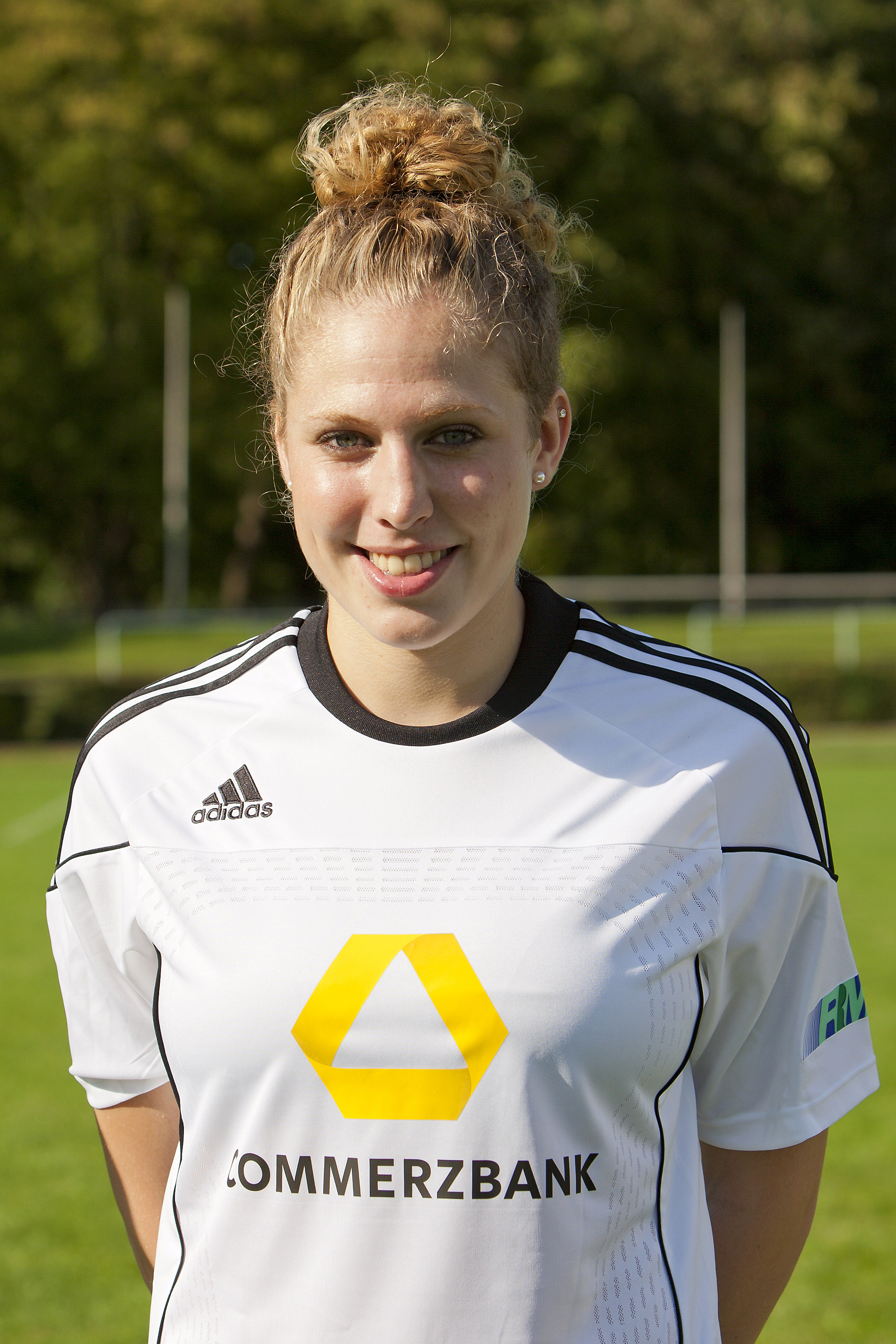
- Kulig in 2011

Personal information
- Full name: Kim Nadine Kulig-Soyah
- Birth name: Kim Nadine Kulig
- Date of birth: 9 April 1990 (age 36)
- Place of birth: Herrenberg, Germany
- Height: 1.76 m (5 ft 9 in)
- Positions: Midfielder; forward

Youth career
- 1998–2001: SV Poltringen
- 2001–2003: SV Unterjesingen
- 2003–2006: VfL Sindelfingen

Senior career*
Years	Team	Apps	(Gls)
2006–2008	VfL Sindelfingen		
2008–2011	Hamburger SV	59	(27)
2011–2015	1. FFC Frankfurt	19	(4)

International career
	Germany U19	12	(12)
2008–2010	Germany U20	16	(5)
2009–2015	Germany	33	(7)
Medal record
Women's football
Representing Germany
UEFA Women's Championship
Gold medal – first place	2009 Finland	Team
- * Club domestic league appearances and goals

Kim Nadine Kulig-Soyah (née Kulig; born 9 April 1990) is a German retired footballer who played as a midfielder or forward for VfL Sindelfingen, Hamburger SV, 1. FFC Frankfurt and the Germany national team.

== Club career ==
Kulig, born in Herrenberg, Swabia, Baden-Württemberg, started her career at age eight at SV Poltringen, where she initially played in a boys' team. In 2001, she joined SV Unterjesingen, before moving to VfL Sindelfingen two years later. She made her 2. Frauen-Bundesliga debut at Sindelfingen, where she scored 17 goals in her first season in the country's second division. In 2008, Kulig won the Fritz Walter medal in silver as the year's second best female junior player. That year she moved to the Frauen-Bundesliga side Hamburger SV. During three seasons at the club, she scored 27 goals in 59 Bundesliga appearances. From the 2011–12 season, Kulig has signed a three-year contract with 1. FFC Frankfurt.

In September 2015 she announced her retirement due to continued problems with a knee injury. She is now working with the DFB and as a soccer commentator for ZDF.

== International career ==
At the age of 18, Kulig reached third-place with Germany at the 2008 FIFA U-20 Women's World Cup. She made her debut for the German senior national team in February 2009 against China. Only seven months after her first international game, Kulig won the 2009 European Championship with Germany. She scored the third goal in Germany's 6–2 win over England in the final .

Kulig returned to junior competition one year later, helping Germany lift the 2010 FIFA U-20 Women's World Cup on home soil. In the tournament's final against Nigeria, Kulig hit the post which resulted in a Nigerian own goal and sealed the German 2–0 victory. Kulig was honoured as the tournament's third-best player. She has been called up for Germany's 2011 FIFA Women's World Cup squad.

During the quarter-final of the 2011 FIFA Women's World Cup she was taken out in the 4th minute due to an ACL injury of the right knee. On 15 September 2012, Kulig made her comeback after 14 months of injury in the UEFA Euro 2013 Qualifiers against Kazakhstan.

== Personal life ==
On 29 May 2016, Kulig married former footballer Melanie Soyah.

== Career statistics ==
Scores and results list Germany's goal tally first:

Kulig – goals for Germany
#	Date	Location	Opponent	Score	Result	Competition
1.	6 March 2009	Albufeira, Portugal	China	2–0	3–0	2009 Algarve Cup
2.	9 March 2009	Faro, Portugal	Sweden	2–3	2–3	2009 Algarve Cup
3.	10 September 2009	Helsinki, Finland	England	3–1	6–2	UEFA Women's Euro 2009
4.	21 May 2011	Ingolstadt, Germany	North Korea	1–0	2–0	Friendly
5.	3 June 2011	Osnabrück, Germany	Italy	3–0	5–0	Friendly
6.	7 June 2011	Aachen, Germany	Netherlands	4–0	5–0	Friendly
7.	5 April 2013	Offenbach, Germany	United States	1–2	3–3	Friendly

== Honours ==
Germany

- UEFA European Championship: 2009

Germany U20

- FIFA U-20 Women's World Cup: 2010; third-place 2008

Individual

- Fritz Walter medal: Silver 2008
- Third-best player: 2010 FIFA U-20 Women's World Cup
