= Calnan (surname) =

Calnan is a surname found in England and in Ireland with several origins, one of them being Irish Gaelic Ó Cathaláin 'son of Cathalán'.

== Royal connections ==
The name is derived from Cathalan, King of Farney slain in 1028, whose name means Little Charles, and from whom the family is thought to have descended. Cathalan was in turn descended from Coleman Mor, the King of Meath and the 133rd Monarch of Ireland.

== In military service ==
- Thomas D. Calnan (1915–1981), English pilot and prisoner of war, writer of memoir Free As A Running Fox
- George Charles Calnan (1900–1933), US Naval officer and fencer, won three bronze medals in four Summer Olympics
- Michael David Calnan (1932–2018), Canadian Forces officer and municipal politician

== In politics ==
- Michael Calnan (died 2025), Irish Labour Party politician and senator from County Cork

== In sports ==
- Joseph Calnan (1876–1947), New Zealand rugby player
- Clement Noel Calnan (1888–1974), English cricketer
- Will Calnan (born 1996), English field hockey player

== Other ==
- John Calnan (1932–2016), American comic book artist
