= Anna Bosch =

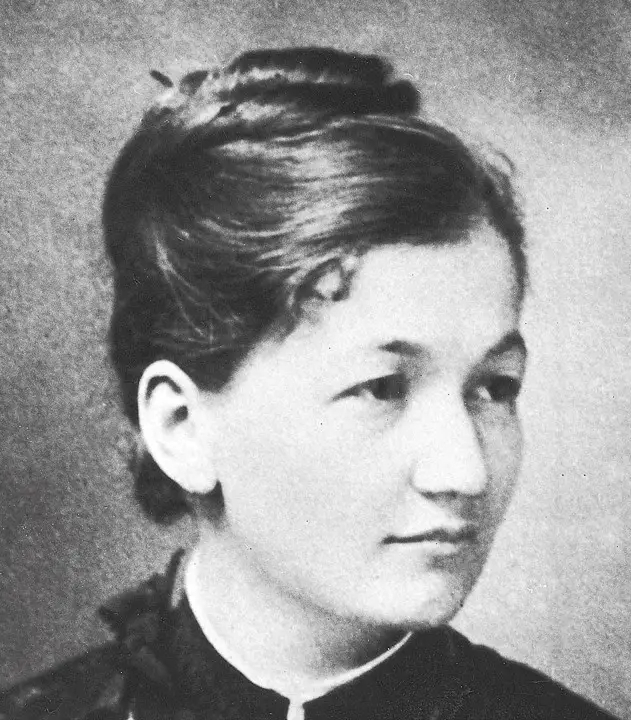
Anna Bosch

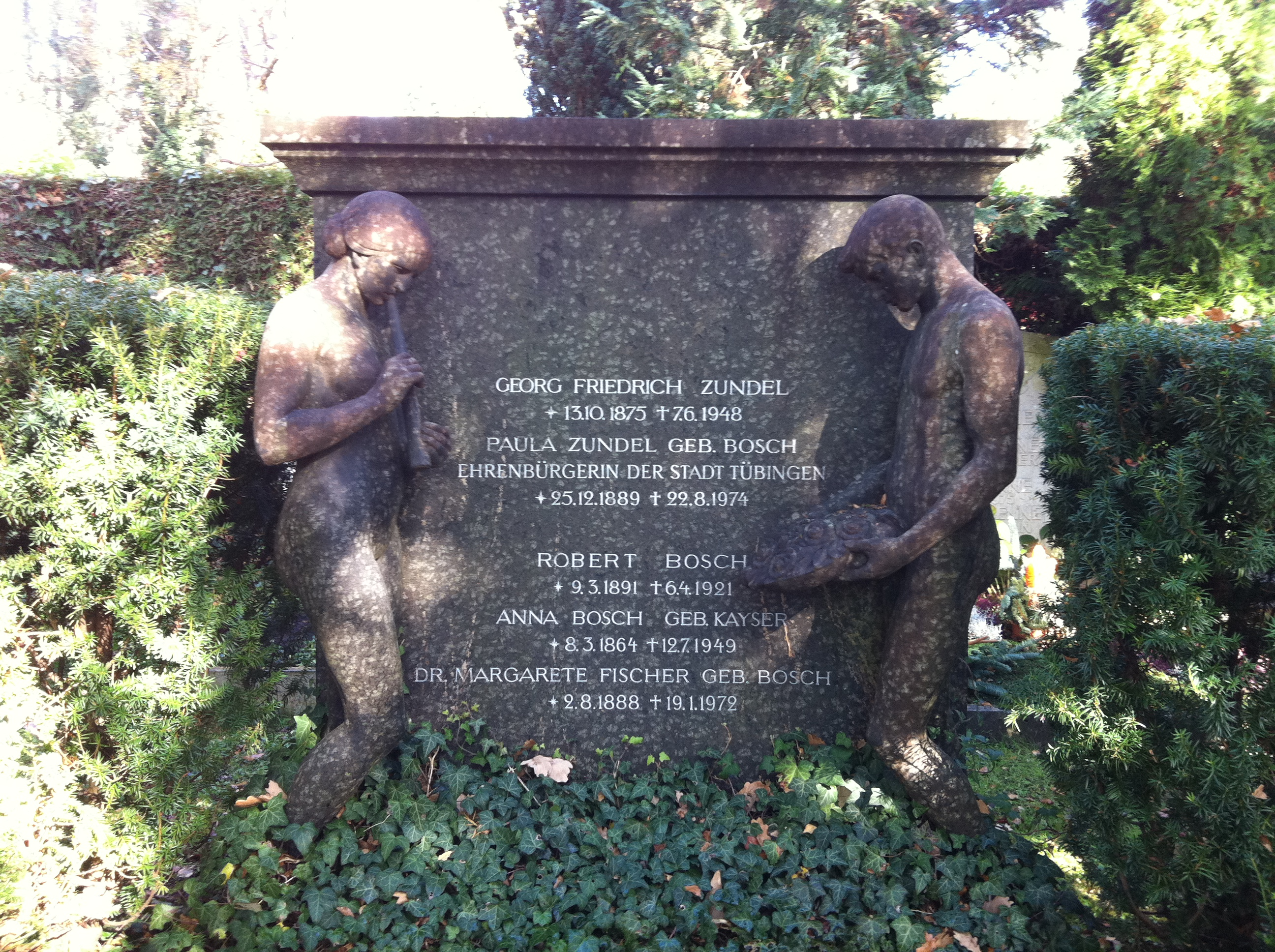
Tomb on the Stadtfriedhof Tübingen

Anna Bosch (née Kayser, born 8 March 1864; died 12 July 1949 in Tübingen) was the first woman to be an honorary citizen of the City of Tübingen. She was the wife of Robert Bosch.

== Life ==
On 10 October 1887, she married Robert Bosch, who was a friend of her brother Eugen and became head of the metal plant in Feuerbach in 1909. In 1888, her daughter Margarete, and in 1889 her daughter Paula was born, and in 1891 her son Robert, who died in 1921 of multiple sclerosis. Anna Bosch, who cared for him during his long illness, fell into a severe depression. In 1926, the marriage was divorced.

For her services to the city of Tübingen, Anna Bosch, who had lived since the divorce in Lustnau with her daughter Paula Zundel and Paula's husband Friedrich Zundel became honorary citizen of the City of Tübingen on 14 February 1934. She was the first woman honored by the city with this award. The Anna-Bosch-Straße in Tübingen-Lustnau and the Anna-Bosch-Studentenwohnheim are named after her.
