= Goldersbach =

River in Germany

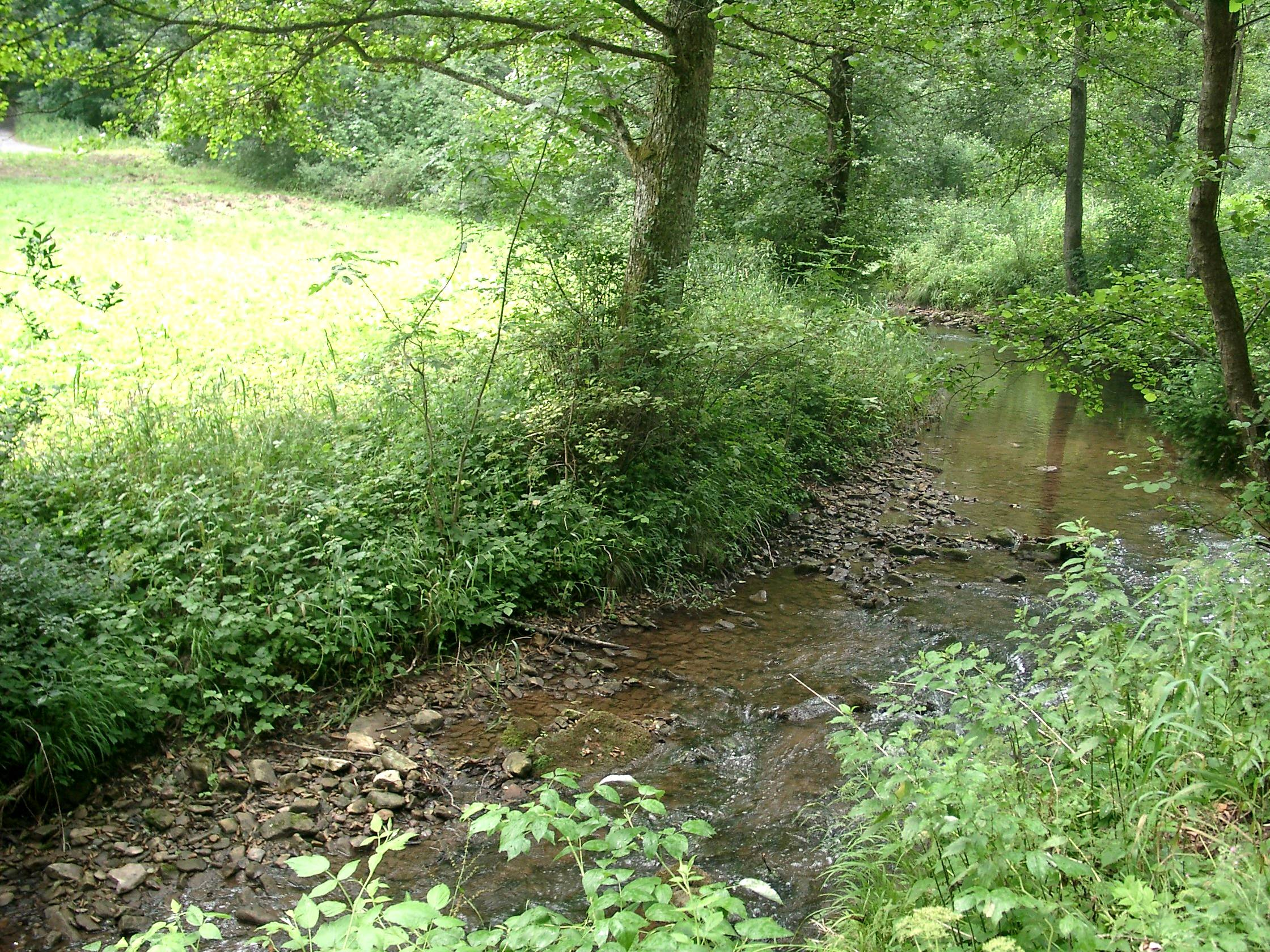

Location
- Country: Germany
- States: Baden-Württemberg

Physical characteristics
- Mouth
  - location: Ammer
  - coordinates: 48.5269°N 9.0753°E

Basin features
- Progression: Ammer→ Neckar→ Rhine→ North Sea

Goldersbach is a river of Baden-Württemberg, Germany. It flows into the Ammer near Tübingen.

== See also ==
- List of rivers of Baden-Württemberg
