= Glockenmuseum Stiftskirche Herrenberg =

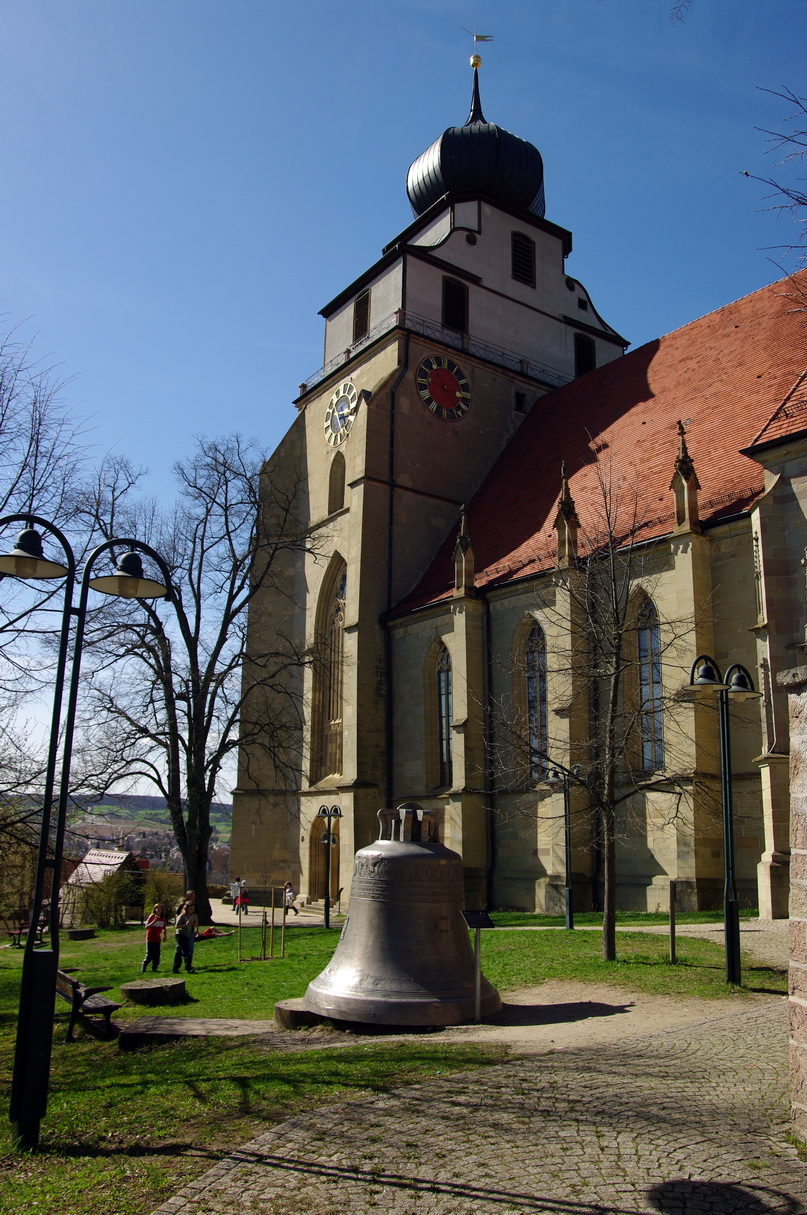
- The bell tower housing most of the bells
- Established: 1990
- Location: Kirchgasse 7, Herrenberg, Germany
- Coordinates: 48.596815°N 8.871009°E
- Type: Bell museum
- Owner: Verein zur Erhaltung der Stiftskirche Herrenberg e.V.
- Website: www.glockenmuseum-stiftskirche-herrenberg.de

The Glockenmuseum Stiftskirche Herrenberg English: Museum of Bells in the Collegiate Church of Herrenberg) is a museum in the bell tower of Herrenberg's main church. More than 35 of the bells in the collection are still in use, some of them are more than 1,000 years old. There is also a Carillon with 50 bells.

It is the most extensive collection of bells that are still in use in the world.

Guided tours are given, in English and German.

== Pictures ==
For high quality zoomable 360°-pictures of the exposition visit www.glockenmuseum-stiftskirche-herrenberg.de/fuehrung.

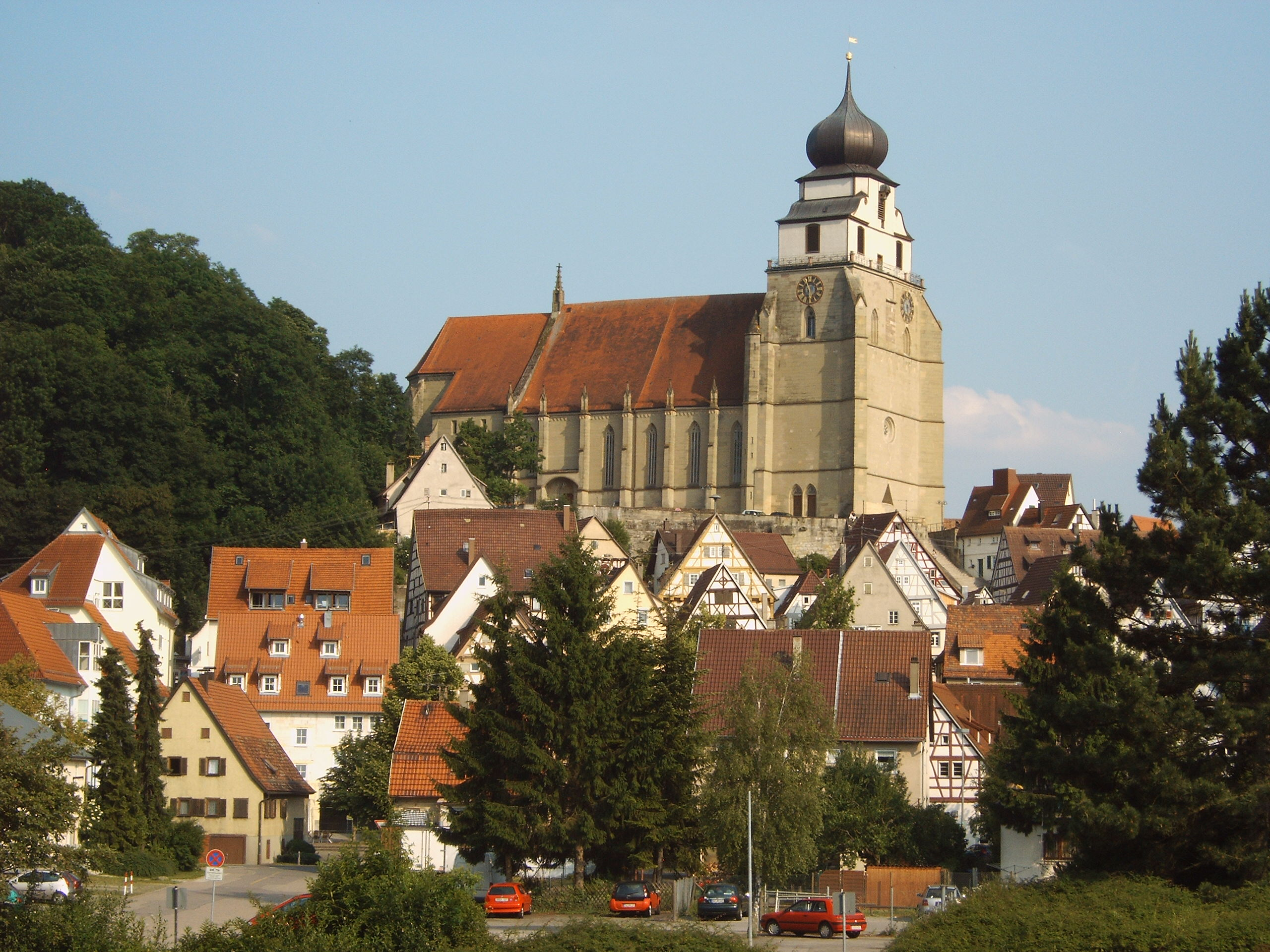
The "Stiftskirche" with its bell tower housing the Glockenmuseum Stiftskirche Herrenberg

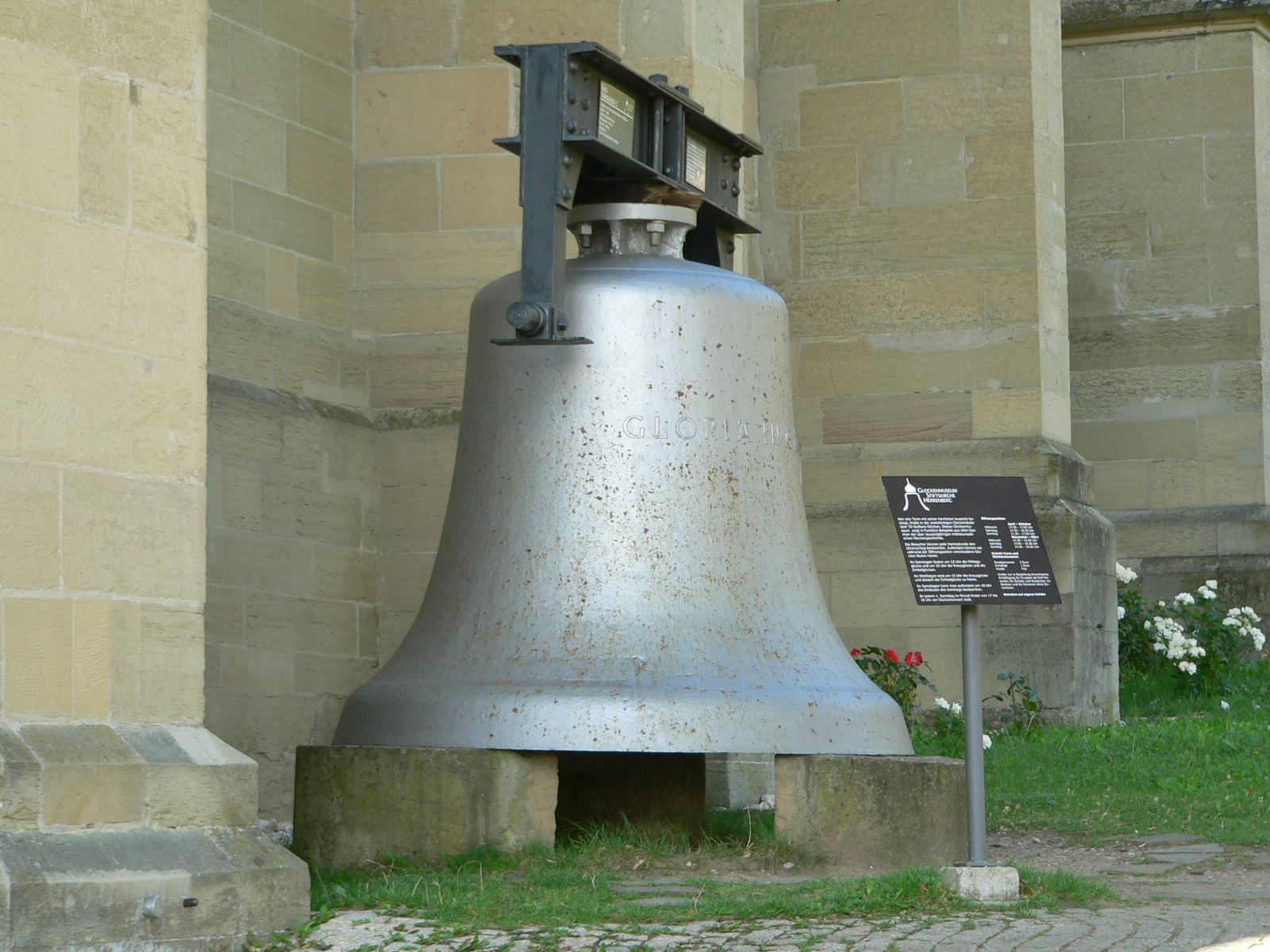
Bell "Gloria" out of steel

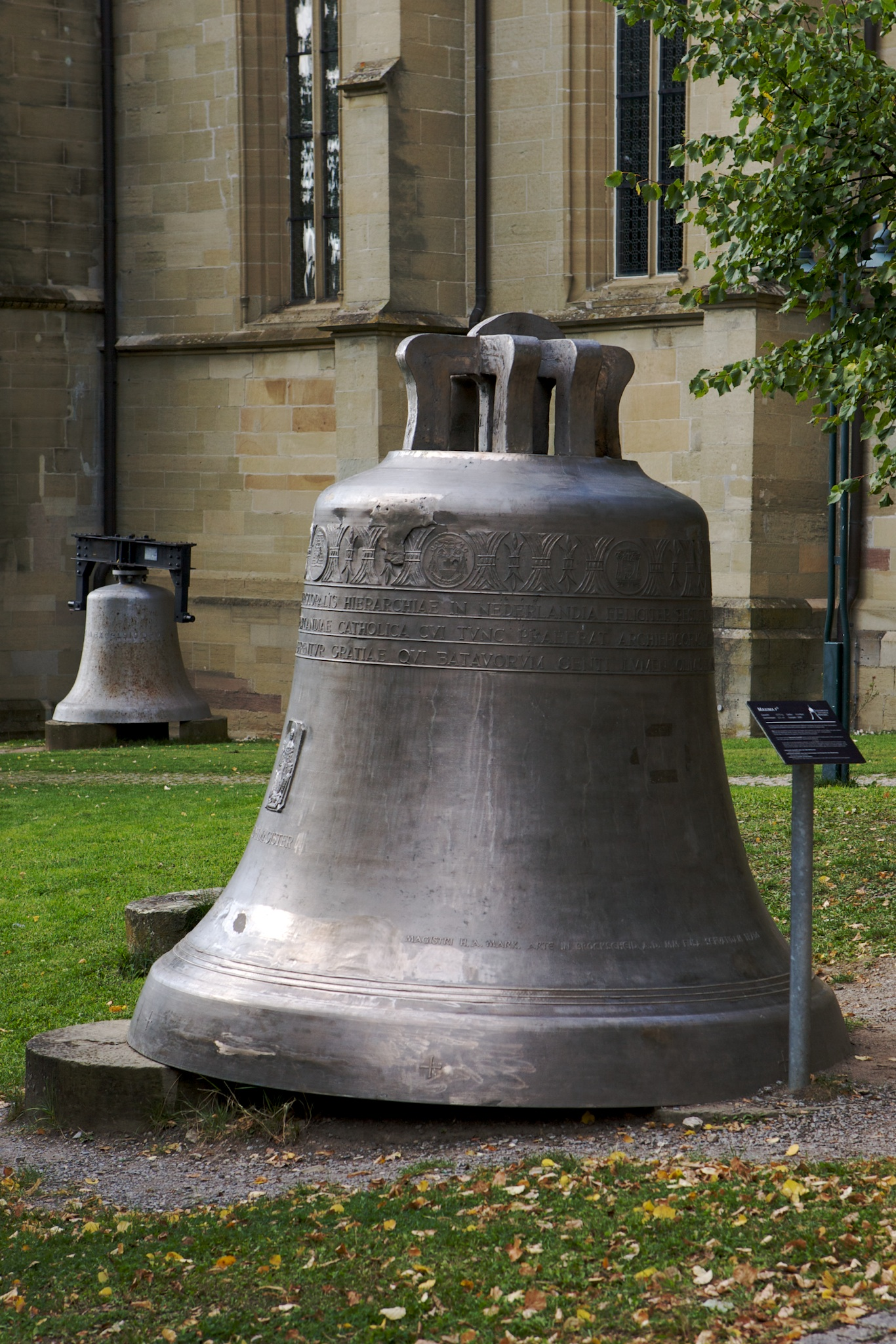
The biggest bell "Maxima" (6.4 tons) is not in use at the moment

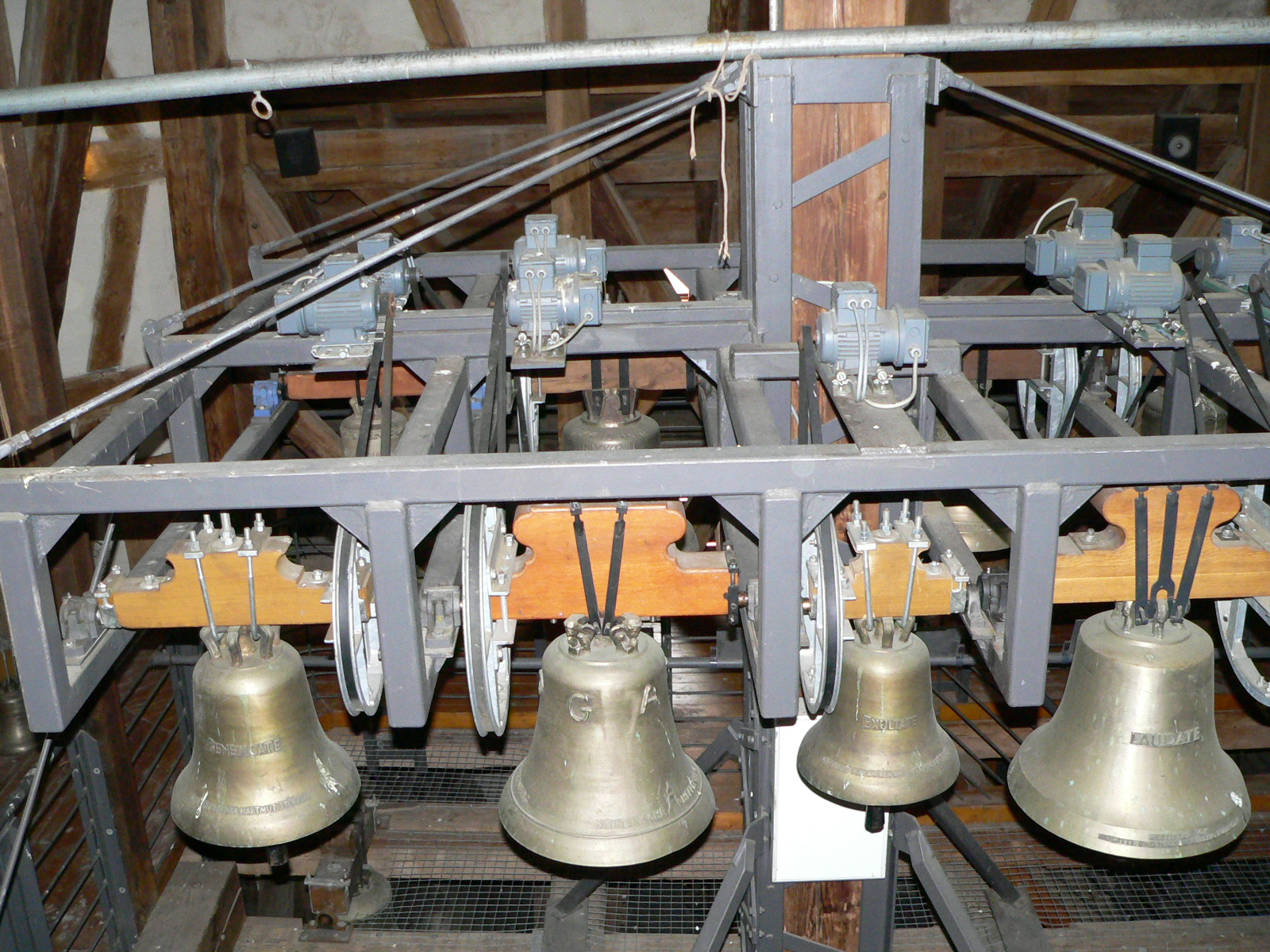
Some of the smaller bells: "Benedicate", "Rogate", "Exultate" and "Laudate"

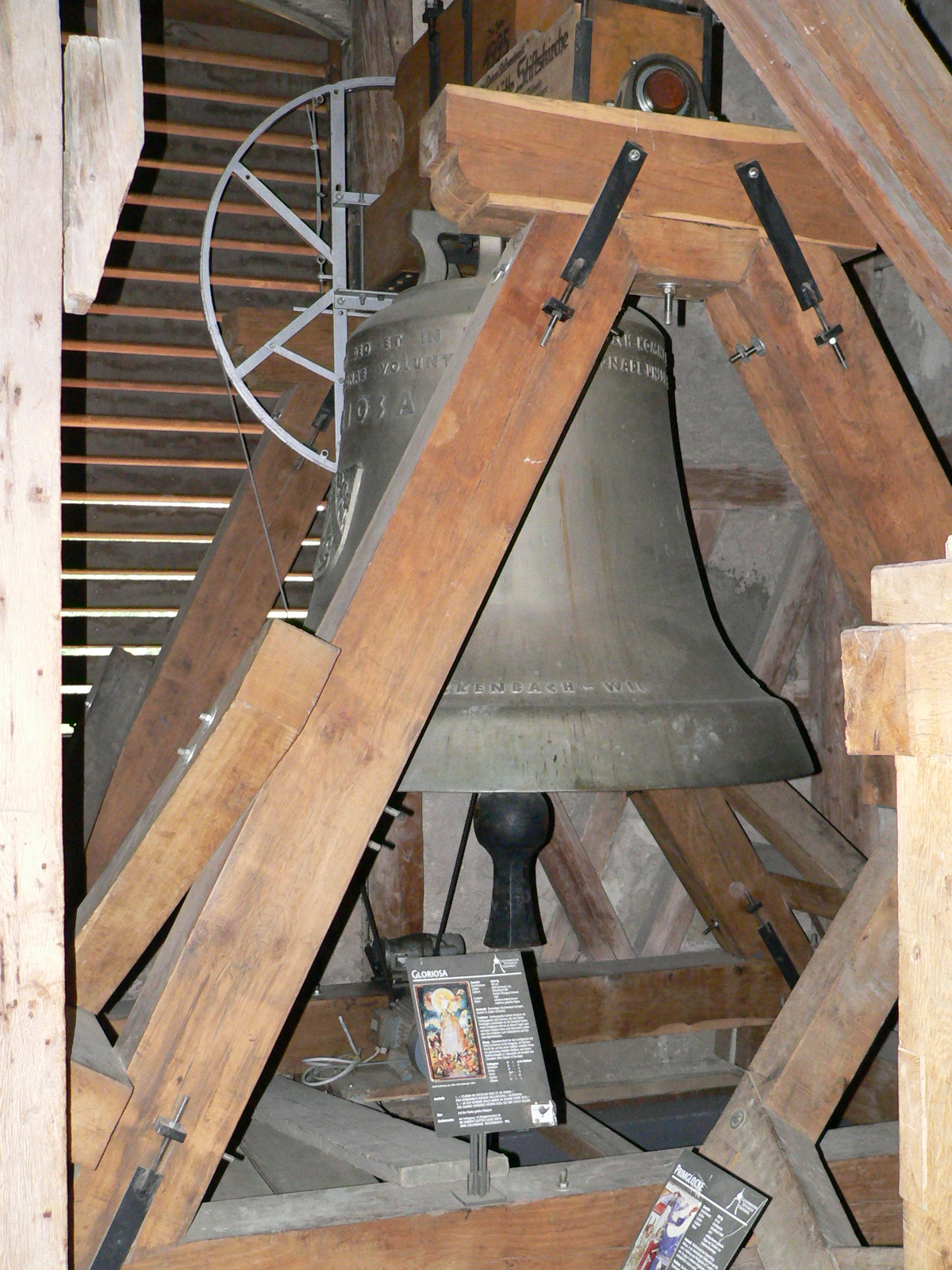
"Gloriosa" in the bell tower (3.6 tons)

== See also ==
- List of music museums
