= Klem =

Klem is a surname. Notable people with the name include:

- Bill Klem (1874–1951), American baseball umpire
- Christian Klem (born 1991), Austrian footballer
- Daniel Klem, American ornithologist
- Erik Klem (1886–1965), Danish gymnast
- Gustav Gierløff Klem (1898–1959), Norwegian forester
- Harald Klem (1884–1954), Danish gymnast and swimmer
- Meindert Klem (born 1987), Dutch rower
- Theodor Klem (1889–1963), Norwegian rower

== See also ==
- KLEM, radio station
- Klem (film), 2023 Dutch film
- Klemm (surname)
- Klemme (disambiguation)
- Clem (disambiguation)
- Klein (surname)
