= Poltringen =

Coordinates: 48°32′N 8°56′E

Poltringen is a village in the centre of Baden-Württemberg, Germany. Before the Württemberg sovereignty came in 1805, Poltringen was two thirds under Austrian rule and one third under Württemberg rule. It has been part of the Ammerbuch municipality since 1971. It has a population of 1,831 on an area of 484 km².

Poltringen lies in the valley of the small Ammer river, a tributary of the Neckar, in the Tübingen district, almost equidistant between the towns of Herrenberg to the west and Tübingen to the east, about 10 km from both.

== See also ==
- Poltringen Airfield
