= Klemme =

Klemme is a German family name, and may refer to:

People

- Dominic Klemme (born 1986), professional road bicycle racer
- Göran Klemme (born 1964), darts player
- Ralph Klemme (1939–2024), American politician
- Randy Klemme (born 1960), American professional wrestler (1998–2008)

Places

- Klemme, Iowa, United States
- Klemmes Corner, Indiana, United States

== See also ==
- Klem (disambiguation)
- Klemm, a surname
