= Gordon Clem =

Australian cricketer (1909–1970)

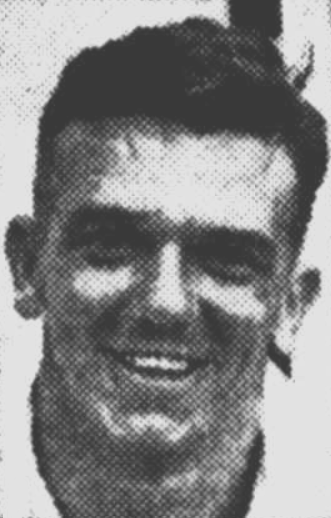
- Clem in 1935

Personal information
- Born: 5 July 1909; Milora, Queensland, Australia
- Died: 3 March 1970 (aged 60); Melbourne, Victoria, Australia
- Source: Cricinfo, 1 October 2020

Gordon Clem (5 July 1909 – 3 March 1970) was an Australian cricketer. He played one first-class match for Queensland in 1932/33.

== Cricket career ==
Clem began his cricket career representing Virginia State School in school cricket, helping them win the 1924–25 premiership. As of 1926, he had begun playing for Toombul in club cricket and was described as "proving himself a good left-hand bowler". By 1929, he had suffered a back injury but was still described as bowling well and above medium pace, and in 1930 he bowled the Toombul B grade team to the B grade premiership by taking 6 for 23 in the final.

In the 1931–32 Brisbane cricket season, Clem took 35 wickets at an average of 15, and in October 1932 he represented a combined metropolitan Brisbane team in the Queensland Country Week cricket carnival and took 7 for 8 against the North Queensland side. In November 1932, he was selected to represent the Queensland state side and made his First-class debut, however his bowling was criticized in the media with one paper writing that he did not seem to want to take wickets and noting that he dropped a catch due to being slow in the field.

In May 1933, Clem left the Toombul side as he had been unable to find regular employment in Brisbane and had taken a job in Rockhampton and it was suggested that his move would help Rockhampton cricket. In 1935, he was selected in the Queensland 'Colts' side and was reselected for the First-class team however he turned down his spot in the side as he took a job in Melbourne instead. He played a season for the Essendon Cricket Club while living in Victoria but moved back to Brisbane and rejoined the Toombul Cricket Club in September 1936.

As of 1940, Clem had moved to Far North Queensland and was playing cricket for Gordonvale. He joined the army during World War II and fought in the Greece and Crete campaigns for the Australian Imperial Force and as of 1941 he had played some cricket in the Middle East with other cricketers in the military. In 1945 he returned to Brisbane from military service and rejoined Toombul. By 1952 he had moved to Southport and was playing as a spin bowler for Southport.

== See also ==
- List of Queensland first-class cricketers
