= Matthias Klemm =

German painter and graphic artist

- Born: 8 May 1941 (age 85)
- Occupations: Painter, Graphic artist
- Website: matthias-klemm.com

Matthias Klemm (born 8 May 1941 in Bromberg, Bydgoszcz) is a German painter and graphic artist.

Prior to 1989, his work focused mostly on criticism of East Germany and Christian themes. In 1989 he formed a personal friendship with Rudolf Otto Wiemer.

In 1990 came his creation of graphical diary pages depicting the peaceful revolution in East Germany during the fall of 1989. During that time he created many works that became symbols for the peaceful revolution and were used for some time by the opposition movements, being shown in churches or seen on the streets in Leipzig and other cities.

Klemm currently lives in Leipzig and works as a freelance painter and graphic artist.

Some of his work is in public and private ownership in the following countries: Germany, Switzerland, Poland, Norway, Finland, Liechtenstein and Netherlands.

== Description of his work ==
His works spans a broad range and mixes different techniques including collage, rollage, lithography, Walztechnik, paintings and designs on building structures e.g. churches, hospitals, and work involving wood structures and glass.

He has used wax technique with Walztechnik, to create portraits of Johannes Brahms, Kurt Masur, Riccardo Chailly, Herbert Blomstedt and Woody Allen.

== List of important graphic cycles ==
- 1970 Meißner Te Deum - 20 pieces
- 1974 Die letzten Tage der Schöpfung
- since 1983 Matthäuspassion
- since 1986 Flugbilder–Gesichtsfelder
- 1988 Schmetterlingszyklus" - 4 pieces
- 1990 Tagebuchblätter - 32 pieces
- 1992 Erfaßt, geschunden und doch lebendig - 18 pieces
- 2000 J. S. Bach Zyklus - 4 pieces
- 2000 Augen-Blicke - 8 pieces
- since 2003 Rufer und Gliederpuppe - 8 pieces

== List of selected references his work ==
- Hanisch, Günter: Auftrag und Anliegen . 13 Künstlerwege hier und heute. Berlin 1975, Evangelische Verlagsanstalt, pp. 189–202, 8 Abb.
- Puttkammer, Joachim: „Gedanken zu einem Künstler“, in: Der Sonntag, 2.5.1982, 1 Abb.
- „DDR-Kunstharen Mathias Klem i Hareid Kunstlag, Første separatutstilling fra DDR i Norge, in: Vest Posten 29.9.1982.
- „Hareid først i Norge med kunstutstilling fra DDR – Menbiletkunstnaren sjølv er nelcta utreiselvoye“, in: Sunnmørsposten, 30.9.1982, 2 Abb.
- Ziese, Alexander: Allgemeines Lexikon der Kunstschaffenden in der bildenden und gestaltenden Kunst im ausgehenden XX. Jahrhundert, Band 4, Forschungsinstitut Bildender Künstler, S. 281/ 3 Abb.
- Tervonen, H.: „Elämä on sekä ohgelma että mahdollisuus, in: Kotimaa, 7.8.1987, 3 Abb.
- Who is who in der Bundesrepublik Deutschland IV. Ausgabe 1996, S. 1589.
- Kataloge Kunstsammlungen Sparkasse: Die Leipziger Schule, Band 3 (Abb. S. 82), Band 5 (Abb. S. 40), Band 6 (Abb. S. 52), Kurzfilm im MDR „Glaubwürdig – der Künstler Matthias Klemm“, 2000.
- Mayer, Thomas: „Die Milchtöpfe tun ihm immer noch weh. Matthias Klemm – ein Künstler, der sich einmischt.“, LVZ, 8.5.2001.
- Gebhardt, Kristin: Vermischen, Einmischen, Widerstehen. Der Leipziger Künstler Matthias Klemm. Wissenschaftliche Arbeit im Fach Kunstgeschichte an der Universität Leipzig 2002.
- "Matthias Klemm - Arbeit aus 4 Jahrzehnten", Passage Verlag Leipzig, 2006, ISBN 3-938543-16-7

== Selected exhibitions ==
- 1971 and 1985 Dresden, Kreuzkirche
- 1979 Leipzig, Thomaskirche
- 1982 Bautzen, Dom
- 1982 Norway, Hareid-Kunstverein
- 1986 Switzerland, Bern, Pauluskirche
- 1989 Magdeburg, Dom
- 1989 Frankfurt, Bundesgartenschau
- 1990 Netherlands, Den Haag, Galerie Ruach
- 1994 Leipzig, Bacharchiv
- 1996 Leipzig, Gewandhaus
- 1999 Leipzig, Nikolaikirche
- 2006 Leipzig, Galerie Bösenberg
- 2007 Dresden, Kreuzkirche (200. solo exhibition)
