= Unterjesingen =

- Village of Tübingen
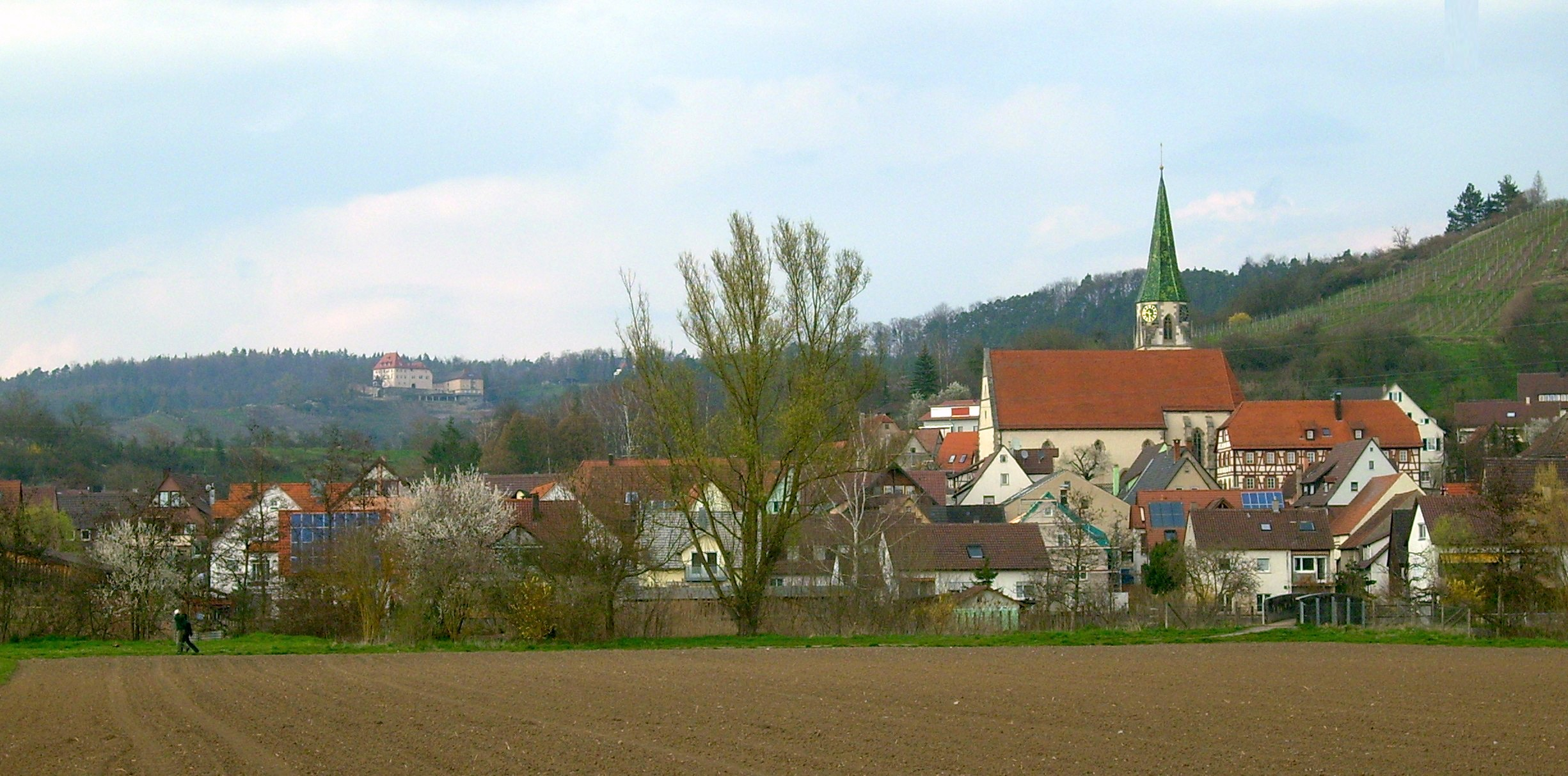

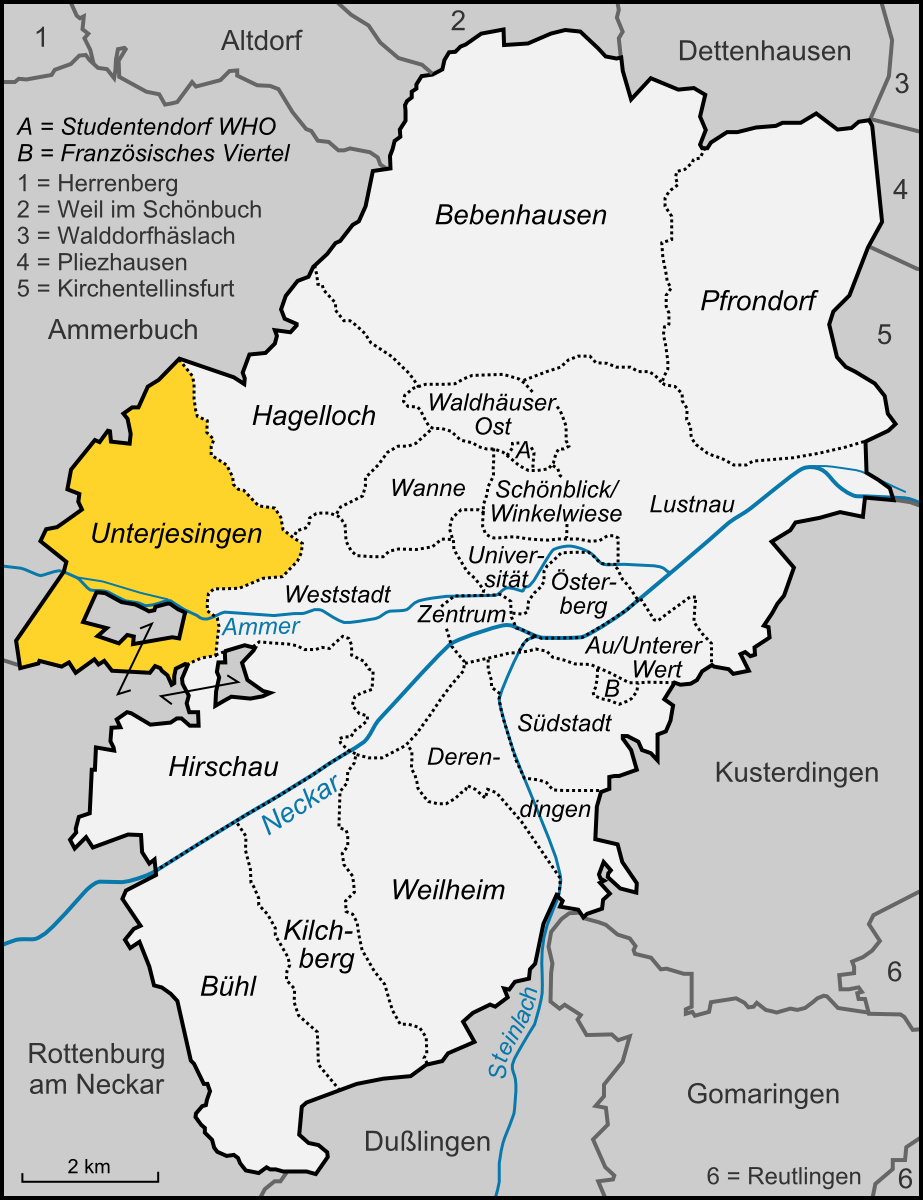
- Location of Unterjesingen within Tübingen
- Interactive map of Unterjesingen
- Location within Germany Location within Baden-Württemberg
- Coordinates: 48°31′N 8°59′E
- Country: Germany
- State: Baden-Württemberg
- District: Tübingen
- Town: Tübingen

Area
  - Total: 8.73 km^{2} (3.37 sq mi)
- Elevation: 361 m (1,184 ft)

Population (2020-12-31)
  - Total: 2,627
  - Density: 301/km^{2} (779/sq mi)
- Time zone: UTC+01:00 (CET)
  - Summer (DST): UTC+02:00 (CEST)
- Postal codes: 72070
- Dialling codes: 07073

Unterjesingen is a village in the centre of Baden-Württemberg, Germany, in the Tübingen district. Since 1971, it is a part of the city of Tübingen.

Unterjesingen lies in the valley of the small Ammer river, about 2 km to the east of Pfäffingen, which is part of Ammerbuch, and 6 km to the west of the town centre of Tübingen.
