= Clem Coetzee =

Rhodesian conservationist

Clem Coetsee (c. 1939 – 7 September 2006) was a Rhodesian conservationist. He developed new methods of big game conservation.

== History ==
Coetsee was at the forefront of the campaign to de-horn rhinos under sedation, to make them safe from poachers who kill for the horn.

He also pioneered the practice of managing elephant populations by sedating and moving entire family groups, from bulls and cows down to calves, in contrast to the practice of slaughtering the mature animals and relocating only youngsters. Moving family groups was seen as more successful in relocating the animals without ill effects, and has been repeated in several countries. In 1992 he had tracking microchips implanted under the skin of more than 40 elephants, which were being relocated from Zimbabwe's Gonarezhou National Park to South Africa because of drought. This was the first time an elephant relocation had used this technology for follow-up.

He died of a heart attack on 4 September 2006.
