= George I. Clem =

American politician and businessman

George I. Clem (September 26, 1910 – December 19, 1988) was an American politician and businessman.

Born in Fairmont, Minnesota, Clem was a high school principal and insurance agency member. He graduated from what is now Eastern Michigan University in Ypsilanti, Michigan. Clem served in the Minnesota House of Representatives in 1947.
