= Johann Conrad Klemm =

German theologian (1655–1717)

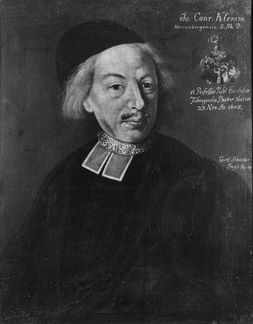
Portrait of Klemm by Johann Gottfried Schreiber, 1714

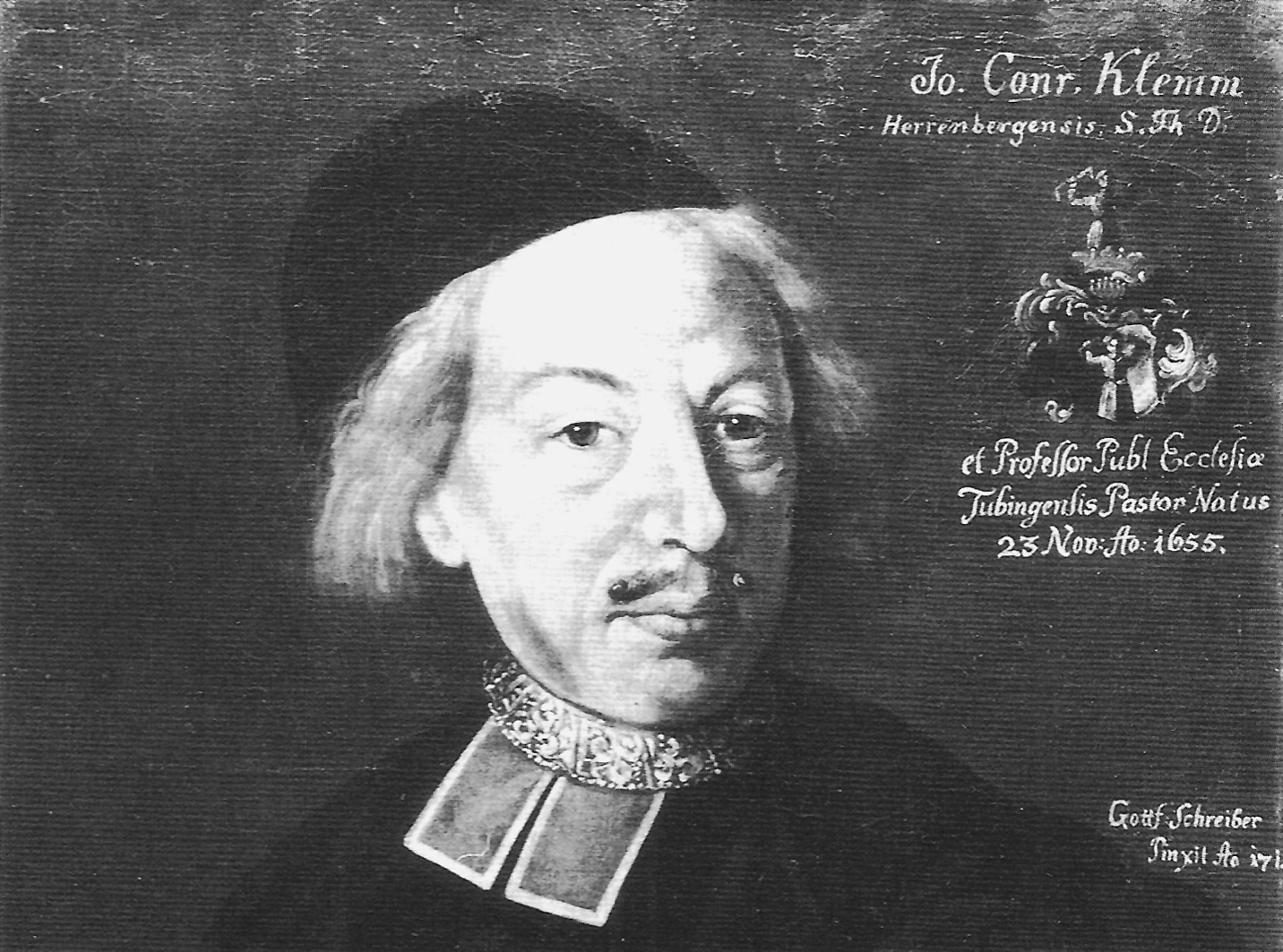
Detail of the portrait above

Johann Conrad Klemm (1655–1717) was a Lutheran theologian of Germany.

== Life ==
Johann Conrad Klemm was born in Herrenberg, Württemberg, on 23 November 1655. He studied at Tübingen, became a deacon in Metzingen in 1683 and a clergyman in Stuttgart in 1688, in 1700 a professor at Tübingen and in 1711 a full professor of theology there. He died in Tübingen on 18 February 1717.

== Works ==
- Do voce βάρβαρος ad 1 Cor. xiv, 11;
- Vindiciæ Locorum Pentateuchis Corruptionis Accusatorum;
- De κοινωνίᾷ θείας φύσεως ad 2 Petr. i, 3, 4;
- De Concilio Benedicti XIII;
- De Papatu Hfierarchico;
- De Nominibus Hebraicis.

== Sources ==
- Pick, B. (1887). "Klemm, Johann Conrad". In McClintock, John; Strong, James (eds.). Cyclopædia of Biblical, Theological and Ecclesiastical Literature. Supplement.—Vol. 2. New York: Harper & Brothers. p. 637.
- Schott, Theodor (1882). "Klemm, Johann Conrad". In Allgemeine Deutsche Biographie (ADB). Vol. 16. Leipzig: Duncker & Humblot. pp. 153–154.
