= Gustav Gierløff Klem =

Norwegian forester

Gustav Gierløff Klem (1898-1959) was a Norwegian forester.

== Biography ==
Klem was born in Porsgrunn. He took the Dr. Agric. degree in 1937, and was a professor at the Norwegian Forest Research Institute from 1951 to his death. He was a co-founder of the periodical Norsk Skogbruk and the research institute Norsk Treteknisk Institutt.
