= Werner Klemm =

Romanian ornithologist

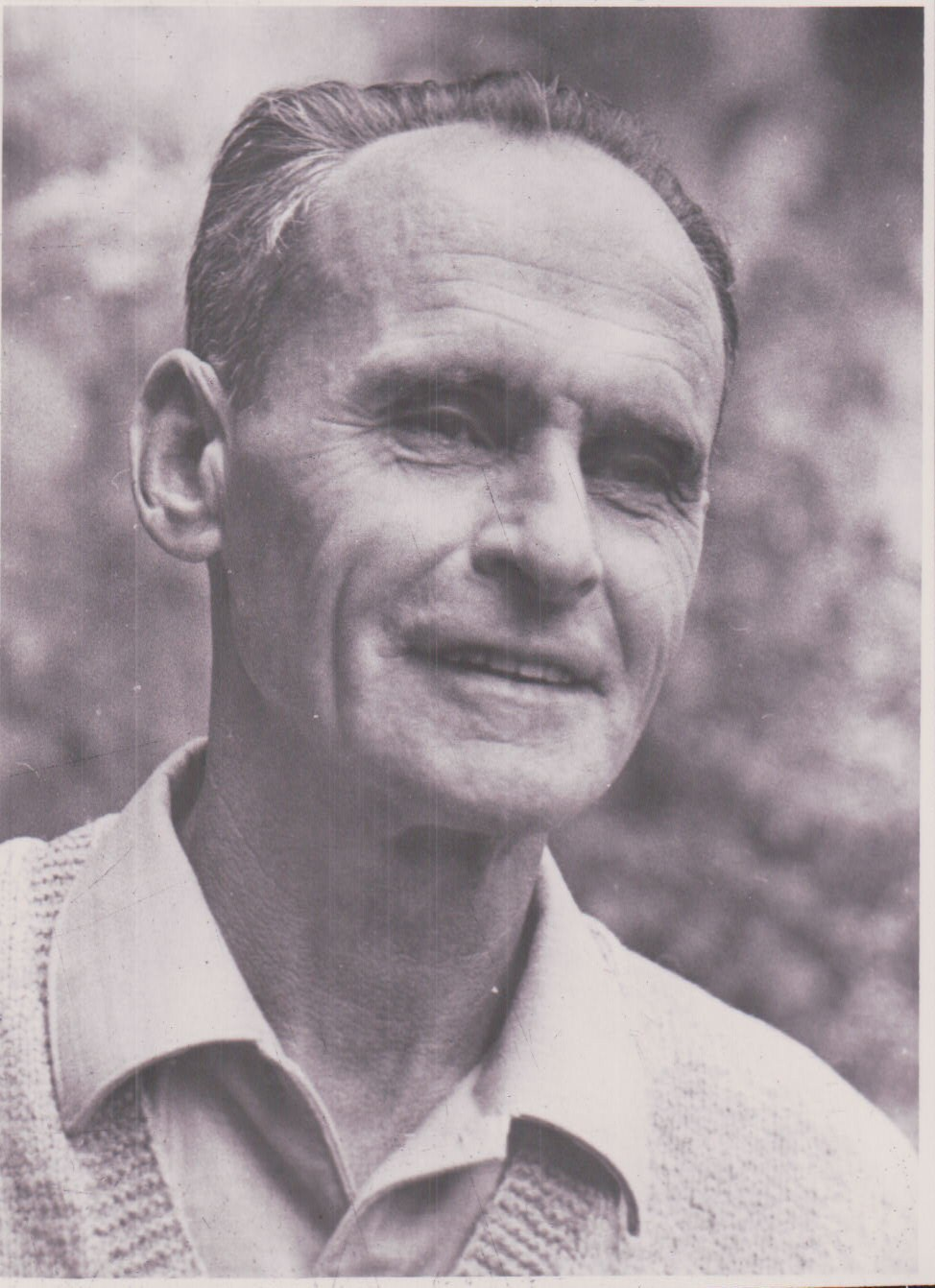

Werner Friedrich Heinrich Klemm (24 July 1909 - 19 December 1990) was a Romanian school teacher and ornithologist who studied the birds of Transylvania.

Klemm was born in Aiud to timber merchant Max Klemm and his wife Selma. The family moved to Sibiu (Hermannstadt) in 1919 where he received his schooling at the Brukenthal High School where he was influenced by Alfred Kamner. He studied natural sciences at Jena University and at King Ferdinand I University in Cluj (Klausenburg), receiving a diploma in science in 1935. He started teaching at a school in Bistrița (Bistritz) and then studied theology at Berlin in 1936 and 1937. He then went to teach in Bușteni. From 1940 to 1942 he taught at Brașov (Kronstadt) and then at Brukenthal High School until 1945. He was deported to the Soviet Union in 1949. He was made an honorary member of the Romanian Academy of Sciences in 1966. In 1987 he and his family moved to the Federal Republic of Germany. He died at Marktoberdorf.

Klemm was involved in natural history education for school students and had helped in building the conservation movement in Romania. He worked on the protection of white storks, white-tailed eagles and the conservation of habitats, particularly in the Danube Delta region. He was involved in ringing birds from 1974 and was involved in bird censuses. He wrote Der Vogelzug (1939) and as many as 164 other publications. Another major work published only in 1985 was the third volume of Die Ornis Siebenbürgens written along with Stefan Kohl. Klemm collaborated in the production of the Birds of the Western Palearctic.

He married Helga Keintzel in 1938 and they had two sons and two daughters.
