= Clem Calnan =

English cricketer

Personal information
- Full name: Clement Noel Calnan
- Born: 25 December 1888; Mile End, Middlesex, England
- Died: 30 January 1974 (aged 85); Southend-on-Sea, Essex, England
- Batting: Unknown
- Bowling: Unknown

Domestic team information
- Years: Team
- 1919–1929: Essex

Career statistics
| Competition | First-class |
|---|---|
| Matches | 4 |
| Runs scored | 49 |
| Batting average | 6.12 |
| 100s/50s | –/– |
| Top score | 24 |
| Balls bowled | 18 |
| Wickets | – |
| Bowling average | – |
| 5 wickets in innings | – |
| 10 wickets in match | – |
| Best bowling | – |
| Catches/stumpings | 1/– |
- Source: Cricinfo, 28 October 2012

Clement Noel Calnan (25 December 1888 – 30 January 1974) was an English cricketer. Calnan's batting and bowling styles are unknown. He was born at Mile End, Middlesex.

Calnan made his first-class debut for Essex against Yorkshire in the 1919 County Championship. He made a further first-class appearance for the county in that season, against the Australian Imperial Forces. He later made two further first-class appearances for the county in the 1929 County Championship, against Surrey and Somerset. In his four first-class matches, he scored a total of 49 runs at an average of 6.12, with a high score of 24.

He died at Southend-on-Sea, Essex, on 30 January 1974.
