= Lustnau =

Borough in Baden-Württemberg, Germany

Coordinates: 48°32′N 9°05′E

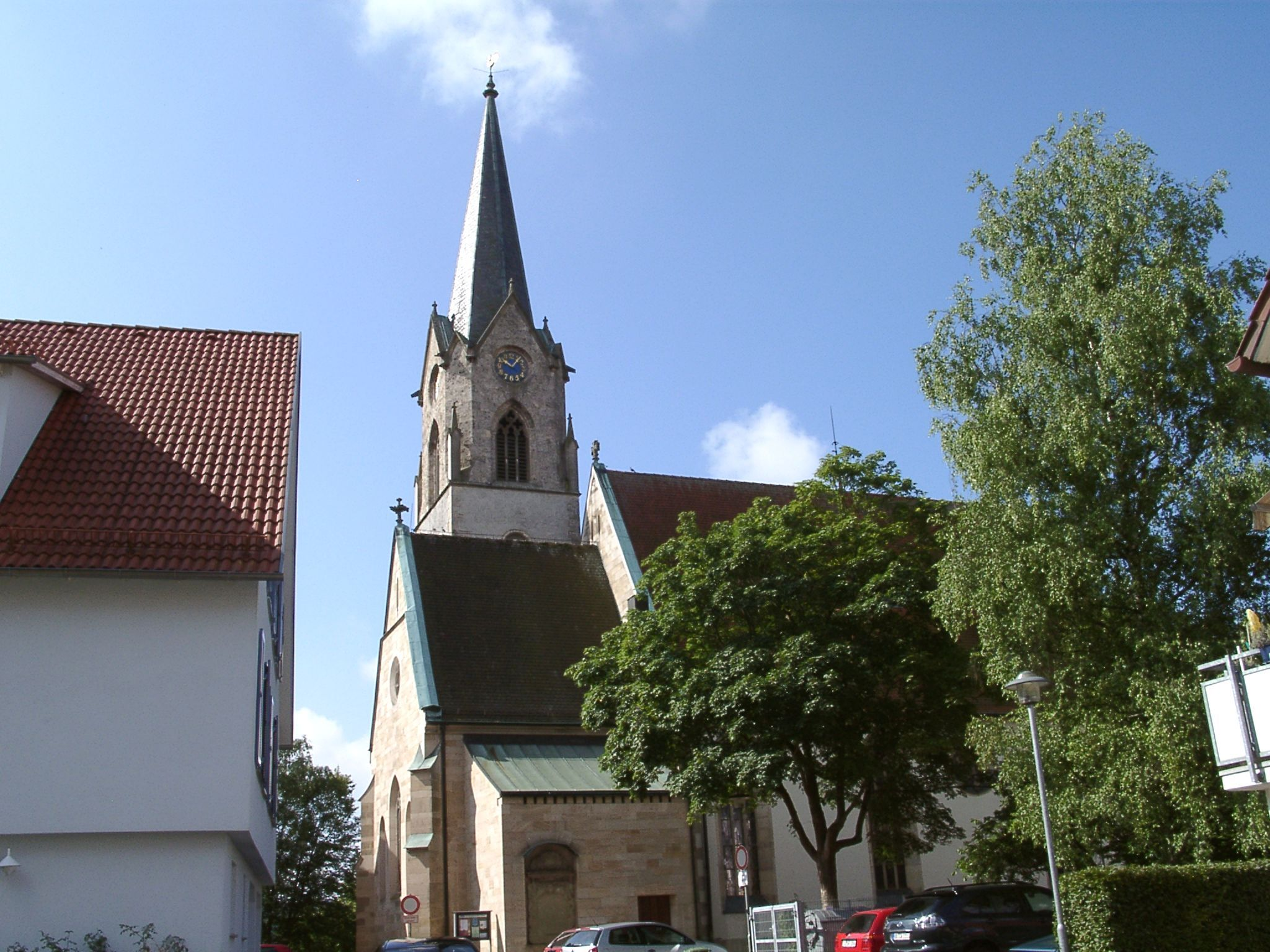
Lustnau Evangelische Kirche Nordseite

Lustnau is a subdivision in the northeastern part of Tübingen, Baden-Württemberg, Germany. It was an independent municipality until 1934, when it became a part of Tübingen. Its present population is around 10,000. Its area is 14.32 km^{2}. Lustnau has four kindergartens and a Grundschule.

== History ==
The area was an Alemannic settlement. At excavations performed in the 1960s near the church remains from the Roman era have been found. The present village was first mentioned in 1100 as Lustnow. Agriculture and viticulture were the main source of income of the village in the Middle Ages. The vineyards were mainly in the localities Herrlesberg, Österberg and Neuhalde. They were replaced by hops cultivation in the second half of the 19th century. In the course of the 20th century the area was more and more urbanized and industrialized. In 1934, the year of its incorporation into the city of Tübingen, Lustnau's population was around 3,500.
