= Ammerbuch =

Municipality in Baden-Württemberg, Germany

- Municipality
- Coat of arms

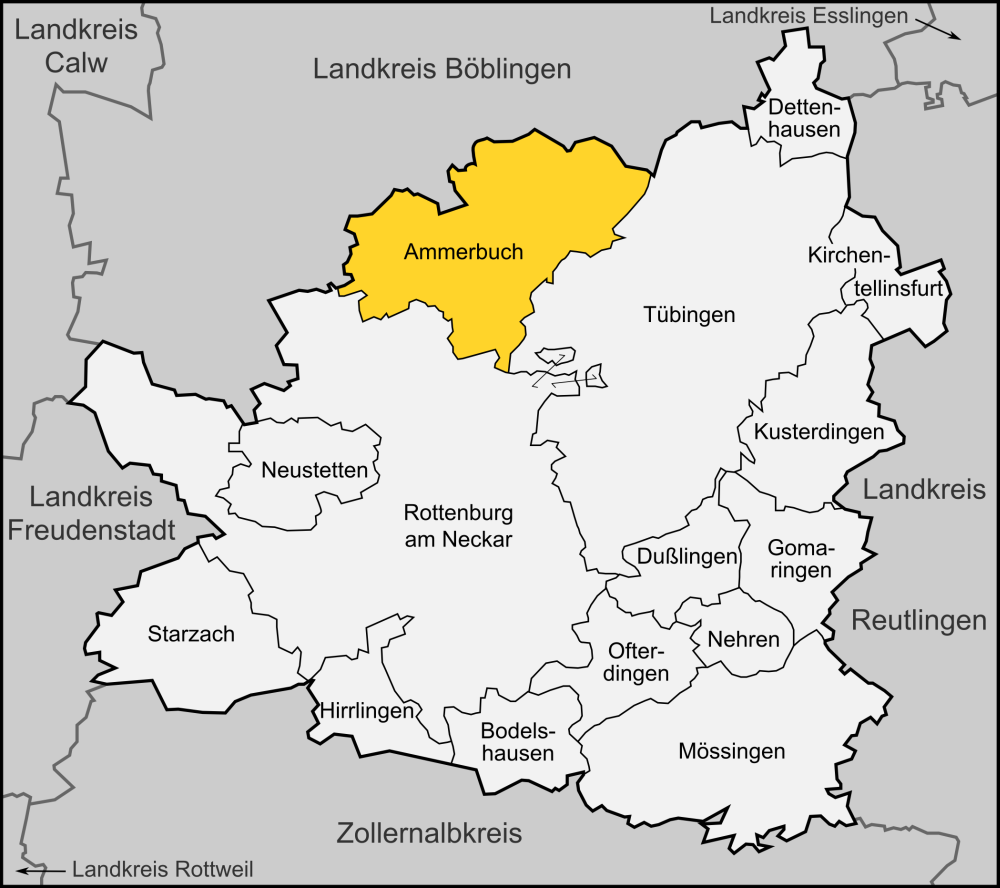
- Location of Ammerbuch within Tübingen district
- Interactive map of Ammerbuch
- Location within Germany Location within Baden-Württemberg
- Coordinates: 48°33′17″N 8°58′02″E
- Country: Germany
- State: Baden-Württemberg
- Admin. region: Tübingen
- District: Tübingen
- Subdivisions: 6 Ortsteile

Government
  - Mayor (2022–30): Christel Halm (CDU)

Area
  - Total: 48.04 km^{2} (18.55 sq mi)
- Elevation: 384 m (1,260 ft)

Population (2025-12-31)
  - Total: 11,386
  - Density: 237.0/km^{2} (613.9/sq mi)
- Time zone: UTC+01:00 (CET)
  - Summer (DST): UTC+02:00 (CEST)
- Postal codes: 72119, 72070 (Hohenentringen)
- Dialling codes: 07073, 07032 (Altingen)
- Vehicle registration: TÜ
- Website: www.ammerbuch.de

Ammerbuch (German pronunciation: [ˈamɐbuːx]) is a municipality in the district of Tübingen of Baden-Württemberg, Germany. It is situated 7 kilometres (4.3 mi) northwest of Tübingen and 345–551 metres (1,132–1,808 ft) above sea level. The name Ammerbuch is a portmanteau of the two locations between which the municipality is situated — Ammer Valley and the Schönbuch nature park.

The former municipal coat of arms shows, on a gold (yellow) field, a rooted green beech tree with a blue wave across its trunk. The tree symbolizes the Schönbuch park, the blue wave beam the Ammer River. The six aspiring branches and six roots of the beech represent the six villages that form Ammerbuch today.

== History ==
The oldest evidence of a settlement in the Ammer Valley goes back to the Neolithic period. Tools, huts, and tombs have been found on the Kirchberg in Reusten, and their age is estimated to be about 6,000 years.

In Pfäffingen, Entringen, and Poltringen there are the foundations of Roman estates. A Roman road, which was later known as King Street or Ammer Valley Road, led from Sumelocenna (today Rottenburg am Neckar) via Unterjesingen, Poltringen, Reusten, and Altingen to Herrenberg and continued to Portus (today Pforzheim). From 84 to 260 the Ammer Valley was dominated by the Romans before they were ousted by the Alemanni.

In the 3rd century, Alemanni originating from northern Germany settled in the Ammertal and on the Schönbuch slopes. Probably in the 5th or 6th century, the six villages arose that now form Ammerbuch. The County Palatine of Tübingen sold their possession in 1293 to the Bebenhausen monastery. Their seat was the Roseck Castle, above Unterjesingen at the edge of the Schönbuch.

After the dissolution of the Bebenhausen monastery in 1534/35, the villages came for the most part to the Duchy of Württemberg and became Protestant. In 1699, Pfäffingen came to Württemberg, the half of Altingen, two-thirds of Poltringen, and part of Reusten came into Austrian possession and were partly Catholic as part of Further Austria.

In 1806, Napoleon rewarded Württemberg for its allegiance, annexing Austrian lands near Rottenburg to it. The villages were administered from 1808 by the Oberamt Herrenberg. In the reorganization of German districts by the Nazis in 1938, Ammerbuch became part of the Tübingen district.

The current municipality of Ammerbuch was founded on 1 December 1971 via local government reform, merging the prior municipalities of Altingen, Breitenholz, Entringen, Pfäffingen, Poltringen, and Reusten.

== Climate ==
Ammerbuch is dominated by pleasantly mild climate, in some places part-time winemakers grow grapes. Ammerbuch is located near the earthquake zone of the Hohenzollerngraben (Hohenzollern-trench).

== Geography ==
Ammerbuch is located between the Ammer Valley and the Schönbuch nature park in the Gäu, a geological region dominated by keuper, gypsum and sandstone layers. Various quarries have operated in the region as a result, including sandstone quarries in Schönbuch and Breitenholz since 1383, limestone quarries in Reusten between 1750 and 1970, and gypsum quarries in Breitenholz, Entringen, Poltringen and Altingen, with only the latter still in operation.

=== Landmarks ===
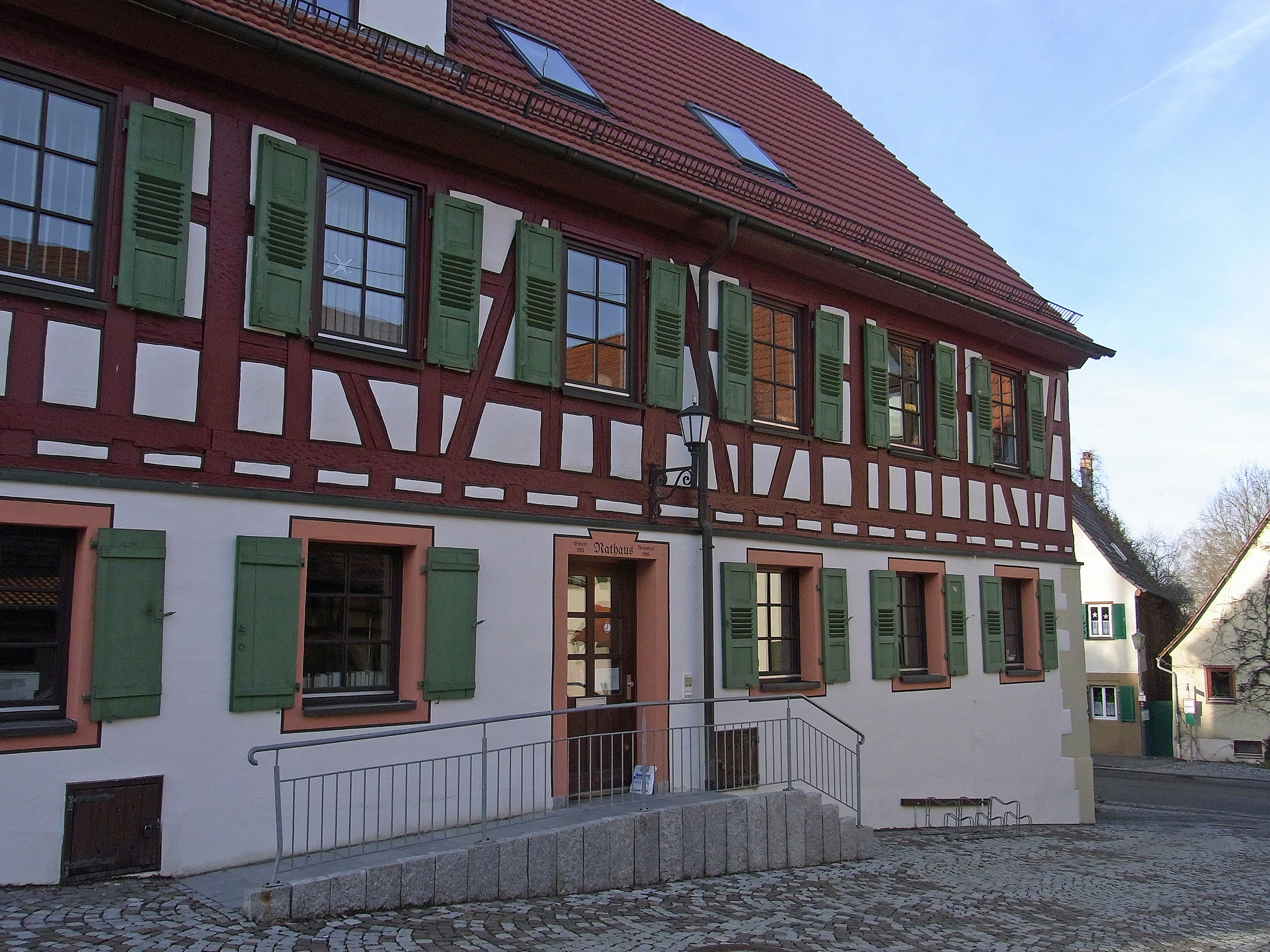
Castle Ammerbuch-Pfäffingen

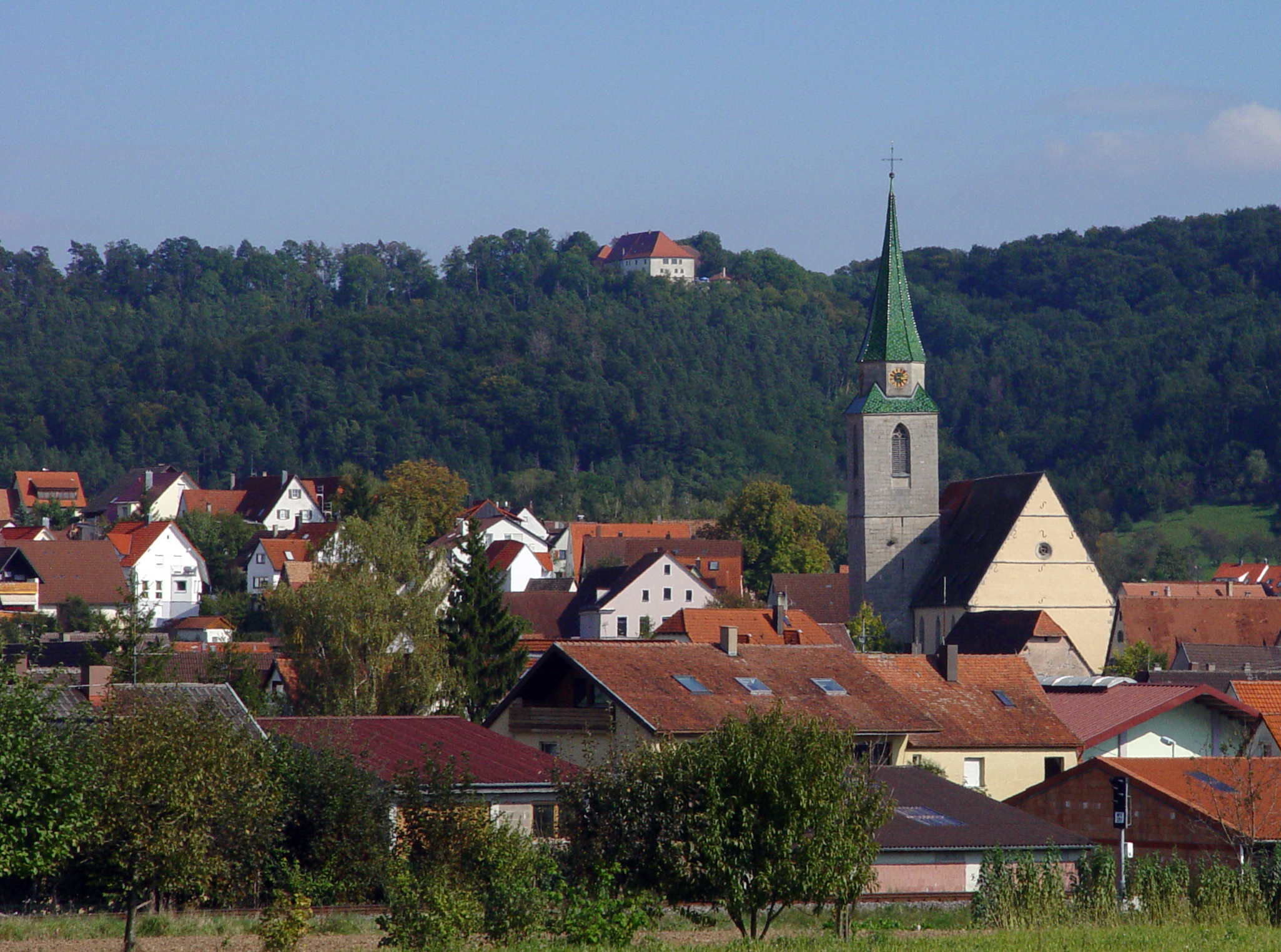
Michael Church in Entringen and Castle Hohenentringenin in the background

- Castle Hohenentringen above Entringen from the 15th and 16th centuries (car access only via Hagelloch)
- Michael Church in Entringen
- Water Castle and mill in Poltringen (can only be viewed from the outside)
- St. Stephenanus Church in Poltringen
- Overgrown ruins of castle Müneck above Breitenholz
- Overgrown ruins of castle Kräheneck on the Kirchberg in Reusten
- Kunstmuseum Manfred Luz in Ammerbuch-Entringen
- Museum Anthon, art in small-picture format in Ammerbuch-Breitenholz
- Schönbuch Nature Park

=== Districts ===
The municipality Ammerbuch consists of six districts (Teilorte):

- Altingen (8.58 square kilometres (3.31 sq mi); 2549 inhabitants in March 2015
- Breitenholz (10.82 square kilometres (4.18 sq mi); 768)
- Entringen (13.94 square kilometres (5.38 sq mi); 3700)
- Pfäffingen (3.70 square kilometres (1.43 sq mi); 1811)
- Poltringen (4.84 square kilometres (1.87 sq mi); 1742)
- Reusten (6.11 square kilometres (2.36 sq mi); 973)

Except for Entringen and Pfäffingen, the districts are villages (Ortschaften) according to the municipal code of Baden-Württemberg, each of which having a local council and a mayor. The castle of Hohenentringen belongs to the Entringen district.

=== Neighboring communities ===
The following cities and towns border the municipality of Ammerbuch, in a clockwise direction starting in the north and are part of either the Tübingen or the Böblingen district: Herrenberg, Altdorf, Tübingen, Rottenburg am Neckar, and Gäufelden.

== Governance ==
=== Council ===
In municipal elections on 25 May 2014, with a turnout: 57.3%, the following allocation of seats resulted:

- GAL: 6 seats
- CDU: 6 seats
- FWV: 4 seats
- BWV: 3 seats
- SPD: 2 seats

There is also a youth council in Ammerbuch since 2011.

=== Mayor ===
In the mayoral election on 16 February 2014, the former councilor Christel Halm (CDU) was elected with 50.9% on the second ballot against four competitors. In the first round on 2 February 2014, she had led with 39.7% well ahead of Andreas Steinacker (GAL) with 29.4%. She assumed the post on 1 April 2014 and is the first woman in this office. On 22 July 2013, her predecessor Friedrich von Ow-Wachendorf informed the council that he would retire 31 March 2014 for personal reasons.

- 1971-2001: Hugo Dieter
- 2001–31 March 2014: Friedrich von Ow-Wachendorf (CDU)
- Since April 1, 2014: Christel Halm (CDU)

== Transportation ==
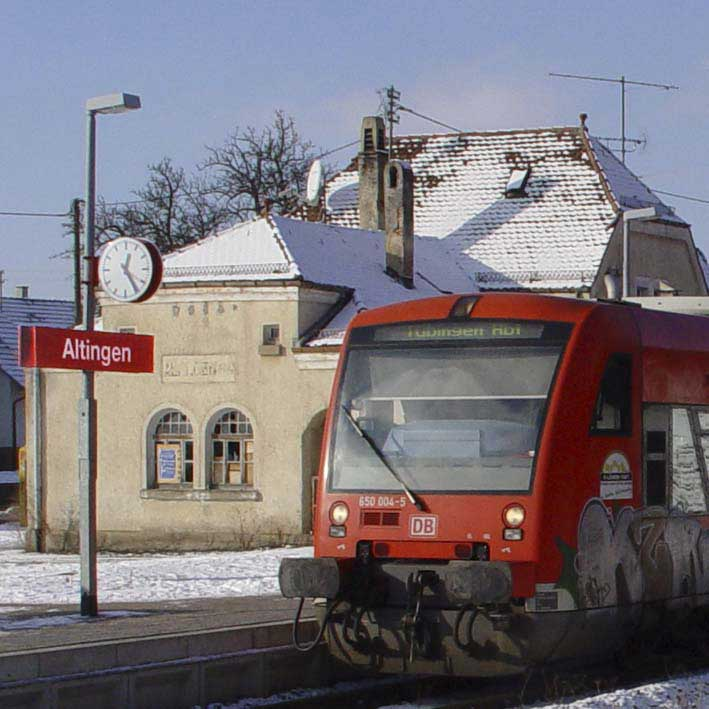
Ammer Valley Railway in Altingen station

The Bundesstraße 28 connects the town with Herrenberg to the west, and then to the A81, and to the east with Tübingen, Reutlingen, and Ulm. From this the provincial road 359 branches off in Pfäffingen, which passes through Pfäffingen, Poltringen, Reusten, and Altingen.

The Ammer Valley Railway runs from Tübingen to Herrenberg through the municipality with breakpoints in Pfäffingen, Entringen, and Altingen. In Herrenberg, it provides connections to the Stuttgart–Horb railway. In Tübingen, it provides connections to Reutlingen, Metzingen and Nürtingen, Wendlingen, and Stuttgart or to Rottenburg and Hechingen). The Ammertalbahn opened in 1910. In 1966, it was shut down. In 1999 operation was resumed.

Public transport is guaranteed by the transport association naldo (Vehrsverbund Neckar-Alb-Donau). The community is located in the comb 110. The Altingen district is on the comb boundary 110/501, the district Pfäffingen on the comb boundary 110/111.

North of Poltringen is the air field of the Air Sports Association Ammerbuch.

== Media ==
The press landscape in Ammerbuch is mainly characterized by two daily newspapers. The Schwäbisches Tagblatt comes from Tübingen and is the most read daily newspaper. The Gäubote from Herrenberg is the second newspaper. The official journal of the municipality is Ammerbuch Aktuell, which appears weekly on Thursday.

== Education ==
Ammerbuch has in each of the six districts a primary school. In addition, there is a community school in Altingen. More schools can be found in Herrenberg, Rottenburg, and Tübingen.

== Notable residents ==
- Adalbert of Entringen (11th and 12th century), nobleman
- Beringer of Entringen (died 1232), bishop of Speyer 1224–1232
- Eberhard von Entringen to 1247 dean and canon in Strasbourg
- Ritter Hugo von Müneck, ministerial of Count Rudolf of Tübingen, the son of a County Palatine of Tübingen
- Heinrich von Müneck, around 1286 Squire (servus nobilis) and from 1295 knight made by those of Hailfingen at the castle Müneck
- Konrad von Hailfingen, called Poltringer, (died 1427), who in 1423 sold the castle and village of Poltringen, was in 1423 and 1426 Württembergian bailiff in Riquewihr
- Adolf Bauser (1880–1948), politician, (Reich Party for Civil Rights and Deflation), Member of Reichstag, Member of Parliament (Württemberg), born in the Entringen district
- Hubert Lanz (1896–1982), general of the mountain troops in the Wehrmacht and war criminal, born in the Entringen district
- Eckhart Dietz (born 1933, in the Pfäffingen district), sculptor
- Roland Asch (born 1950), Race Driver DTM (1985–1994), Porsche 944 Cup, Porsche Carrera Supercup, born in the Altingen district
- Kim Kulig (born 1990), football player

== Literature ==
- Roland Fakler: Bilderbuch Ammerbuch – mit Texten, Bildern und Karten, Ammerbuch 2002
- Hans Anthon Wagner, Wolfgang Wulz: Schwäbische Ortsnecknamen – Von Leuten, die mit Gold düngen, Breitenholzer Igelverlag, Ammerbuch 1996, ISBN 3-929695-03-0
- Hans Anthon: Schäferkarren-Philosophie – Gedichte und Geschichten des Einsiedlers vom Schönbuch , Breitenholzer Igelverlag, Ammerbuch 2005, ISBN 3-937292-36-5

== See also ==
- Entringen (district of Ammerbuch)
