= Herrenberg =

- Town
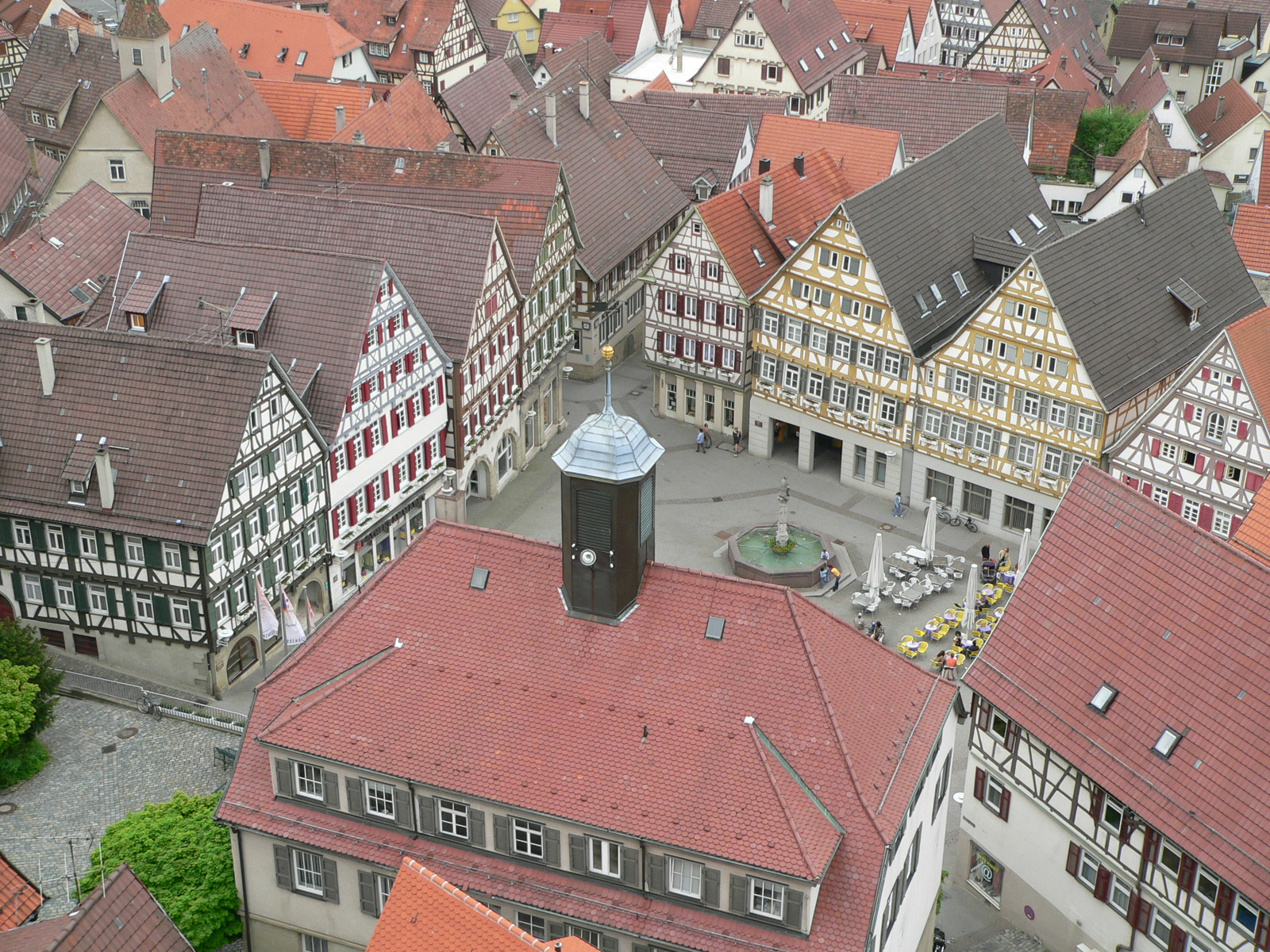

- Coat of arms

- Location of Herrenberg within Böblingen district
- Interactive map of Herrenberg
- Location within Germany Location within Baden-Württemberg
- Coordinates: 48°35′48″N 8°52′15″E
- Country: Germany
- State: Baden-Württemberg
- Admin. region: Stuttgart
- District: Böblingen
- Subdivisions: 8

Government
  - Mayor (2023–31): Nico Reith (Ind.)

Area
  - Total: 65.7 km^{2} (25.4 sq mi)
- Elevation: 460 m (1,510 ft)

Population (2025-12-31)
  - Total: 34,167
  - Density: 520/km^{2} (1,350/sq mi)
- Time zone: UTC+01:00 (CET)
  - Summer (DST): UTC+02:00 (CEST)
- Postal codes: 71070–71083
- Dialling codes: 07032
- Vehicle registration: BB
- Website: herrenberg.de

Herrenberg (German pronunciation: [ˈhɛʁənbɛʁk]; Swabian: Härrabärg or Haerebärg) is a town in the middle of Baden-Württemberg, Germany, about 30 km south of Stuttgart and 20 km from Tübingen. After Sindelfingen, Böblingen, and Leonberg, it is the fourth largest town in the district of Böblingen.

== Location ==
Herrenberg is situated on the western edge of the Schönbuch forest and is a central town within the Gäu region. The Stiftskirche, which houses the Glockenmuseum (bell museum), is a tourist attraction in the main square.

The following towns and municipalities border Herrenberg. They are listed in clockwise direction beginning in the north:

Deckenpfronn, Gärtringen, Nufringen, Hildrizhausen and Altdorf (all Böblingen district), Ammerbuch (Tübingen district), Gäufelden and Jettingen (both Böblingen district) as well as Wildberg (Calw district).

== History ==
The once small community Herrenberg was formed out of the hamlets "Mühlhausen" and "Raistingen", which were combinated in the 13th century, when Herrenberg was founded. In 1278, Herrenberg was first documented, although Pfalzgraf Rudolf von Tübingen already wrote in 1228 "castrum nostrum herrenberc" into a certificate. From 1276, the church building was started, which at the time, had two towers.

In the year 1276, Herrenberg was described as a fortified town with a market. Two years later, the town used its first official seal. Herrenberg then became the main town for the counts Palatine of Tübingen, known as "die Scherer". In 1382, the town was sold to Count Eberhard II (the Greiner) of Württemberg by the last Count Konrad II (the Scherer). Following this, Herrenberg became the main center for the nearby villages and was recognized as an official Württemberg town.

On the 5th of January in the year 1293, the church of Herrenberg was consecrated by Brother Boniface, the Bishop of Constance.

On February 6, 1347, Herrenberg underwent a division of the lordship, resulting in the establishment of Oberherrenberg and Unterherrenberg by the brothers Count Palatine Rudolf III and Conrad I. This division led to the creation of separate courts and town seals for each part.

In 1382, the lordship and the town of Herrenberg, along with all its associated assets and rights in Schönbuch, were transferred to the Counts of Württemberg.

After Herrenberg suffered a devastating fire in 1466 and was affected by the Peasants' War in 1525, the Thirty Years' War marked the conclusion of the town's medieval era. The extensive town fire of 1635 resulted in the destruction of almost all buildings. Furthermore, the population decreased to approximately 40% of its pre-war level due to plague and epidemics.

The supposed founder of the Rosicrucian movement in Europe, Johann Valentin Andreae, who also wrote The Chemical Wedding of Christian Rosenkreutz, was born in Herrenberg on 17 August 1586.

== Town arrangement ==
Herrenberg consists of the town centre and the 7 additional towns which were merged in the regional reorganization of the 1960s and 1970s. The number of inhabitants of Herrenberg exceeded 20,000 in 1972 due to the incorporation of the following formerly independent municipalities:

- 1965: Affstätt
- 1971: Haslach, Kayh, Kuppingen, and Mönchberg
- 1972: Oberjesingen
- 1975: Gültstein

In each different area of Herrenberg there is an office for the district and a town clerk.

== Population ==
Year	Population
1622	ca. 1,800
1652	1,006
1771	1,570
1803	1,796
1825	1,985
1843	2,140
1861	2,015
1 December 1871	2,127
1 December 1880¹	2,646
1 December 1890¹	2,614
1 December 1900¹	2,557
1 December 1910¹	2,705
16 June 1925¹	3,021

Year	Population
16 June 1933¹	3,395
17 May 1939¹	3,689
1946	5,605
13 September 1950¹	6,292
6 June 1961¹	9,539
27 May 1970¹	12,573
31 December 1975	24,389
31 December 1980	25,422
27 May 1987¹	26,001
31 December 1990	27,344
31 December 1995	28,839
31 December 2000	30,377
30 September 2004	31,195
23 November 2006²	31,235
31 December 2010	31,292

- ¹ Census results
- ² Herrenberg Amtsblatt 23 November 2006

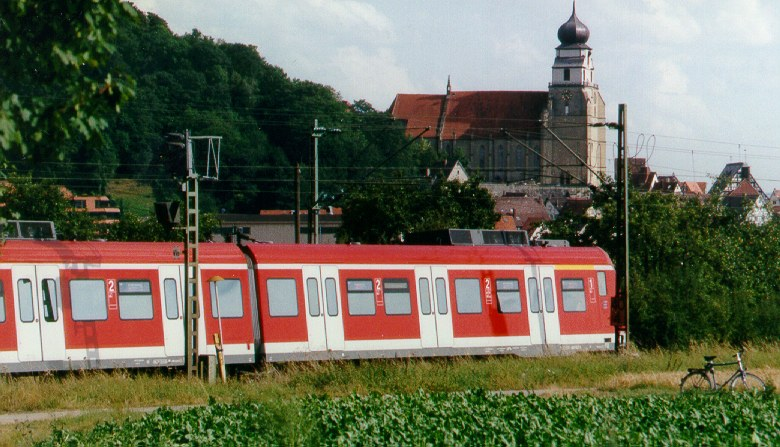
The S-Bahn train

== Politics ==
A total of 32 Seats make up the local council, with the latest election having been held in 2024. The distribution of the different parties and groups are as follows:

Party	Votes	%	+/-	Seats	+/-
Free Voters (FW)	113,548	25.3	▼5.9	8	▼4
Alliance 90/The Greens (Grüne)	107,224	23.9	▲7.3	8	▲3
Christian Democratic Union (CDU)	77,319	17.2	▼6.3	5	▼3
Social Democratic Party (SPD)	65,099	14.5	▼2.5	5	±0
Frauenliste (FL)	41,232	9.2	▲0.7	3	±0
Free Democratic Party (FDP)	?	5.8	▲2.6	2	▲1
Alternative for Germany (AfD)	?	3.8	New	1	New
Liste Perspektive	?	0.3	New	0	New
Electorate/voter turnout	?	65.3	▲11+		
Source: herrenberg.de

== Business ==
Internationally known businesses located in Herrenberg include:

- Frog Design (industrial design)
- IBM (IT training and sales)
- Omega Pharma (pharmaceuticals)
- Walter Knoll (furniture)

== Transport ==
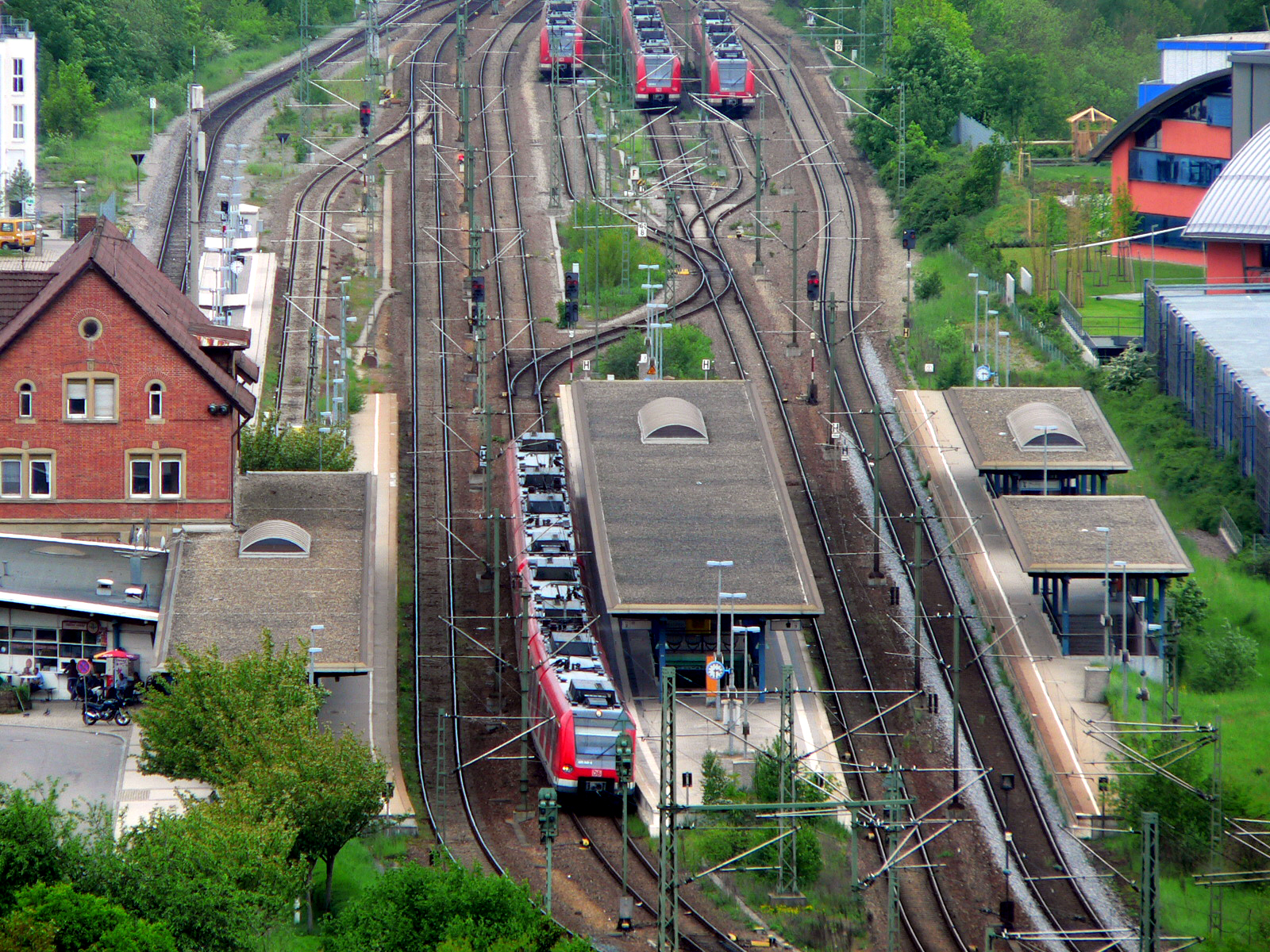
Herrenberg train station

Herrenberg station is on the Stuttgart–Horb railway and is at the start of the Ammer Valley Railway (Ammertalbahn) It is the southern end of services on line S1 of the Stuttgart S-Bahn. It also has connections, via the A81, to Stuttgart and northern Germany. To the south the A81 provides access to Switzerland, Austria and Italy. Herrenberg is also close to Strasbourg, which is only about 110 km to the west.

== Tourism ==
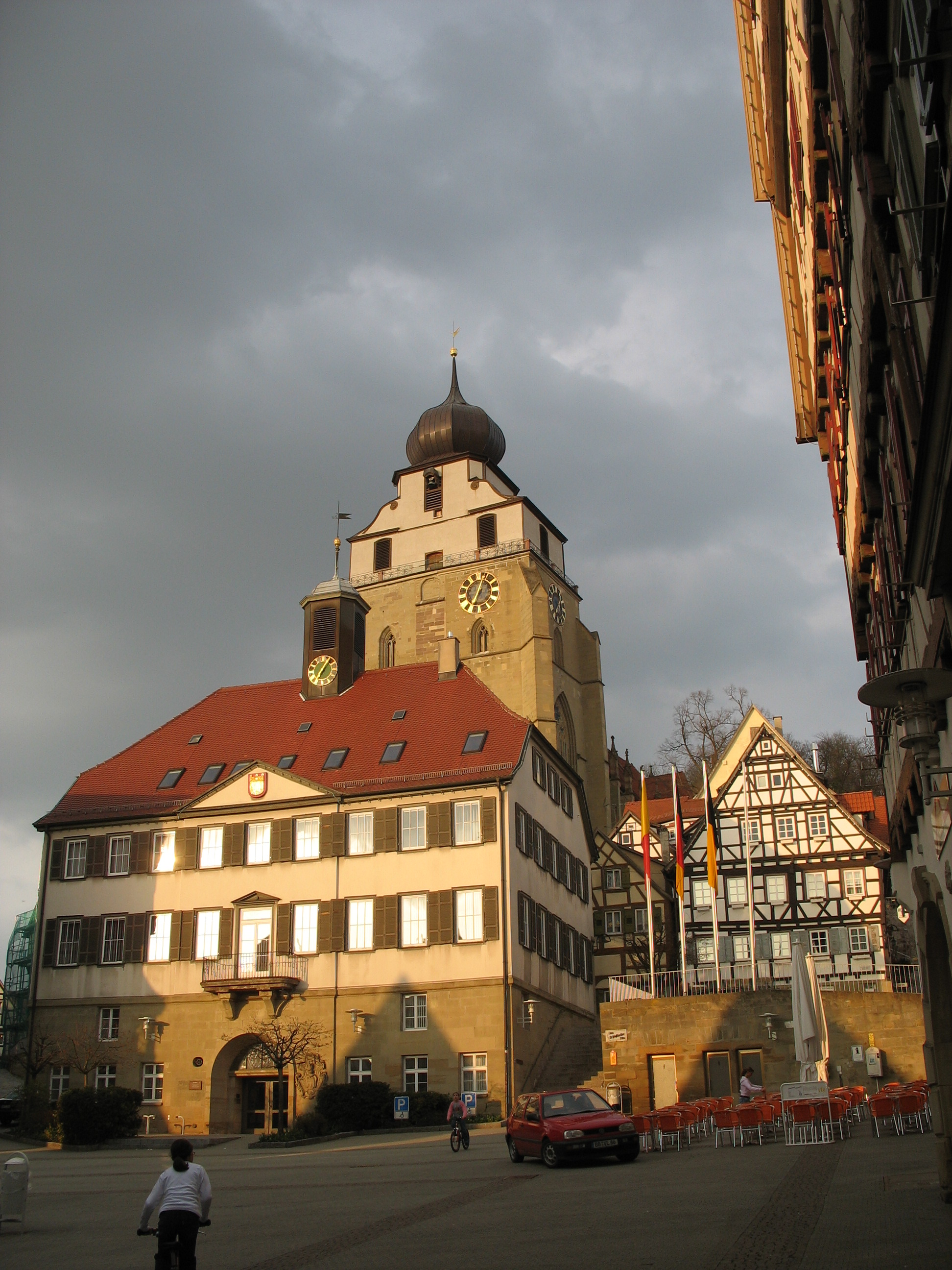
Town hall in front of the historical collegial church

Herrenberg has several hotels as well as accommodations in smaller guest houses in the Old Town. The Old Town has many restaurants including; Italian, Chinese, Indian, Greek, Mexican and German cuisine. There are also ice cream shops and cafes. The Stadtfest (town festival) is held annually in July. 25,000 people turn up for the town festival to celebrate, drink, and listen to the live music in the squares.

=== Sights ===
The symbol of the town, the traditional church "Stiftskirche", with its Glockenmuseum (bell museum) the tower, as well as the "Herrenberger Rathaus" (town hall) and the historical ruins of the castle "Schlossberg", are an attractive destination for tourists of all over the world. There are guided tours (some in English) as well through the historical buildings of the town. Large sections of the old city wall are still standing (or have been rebuilt) and numerous timber-framed houses fill the "Old Town" surrounding the "Marktplatz" (market place).

== Sport ==
The Baseball & Softball Club Herrenberg Wanderers' men's team played in the Baseball Bundesliga in 2002 and 2004, and since 2007 the women have been represented in the 1st Softball Bundesliga. In 1999, the youth team became German champions.

The first men's handball team, SG H2Ku Herrenberg (SGH2Ku), secured the championship title in the Southern Regional League on the last matchday of the 2009–2010 season and thus promotion to the 2nd Handball Bundesliga, the second handball league. The SG finished the 2010–2011 season in 14th place, which was not enough to stay in the 2nd Handball League due to the league restructuring. The SG played in the 3rd league in the 2011–2012 season. In June 2011, the team was renamed SG H2Ku Herrenberg. The female A-youth team became German runner-up in the 2002–2003 season.

Currently, there is one major football club in Herrenberg called VfL Herrenberg. Its women's team plays in the Regionalliga Süd, the third tier of German football.

== Notable people ==
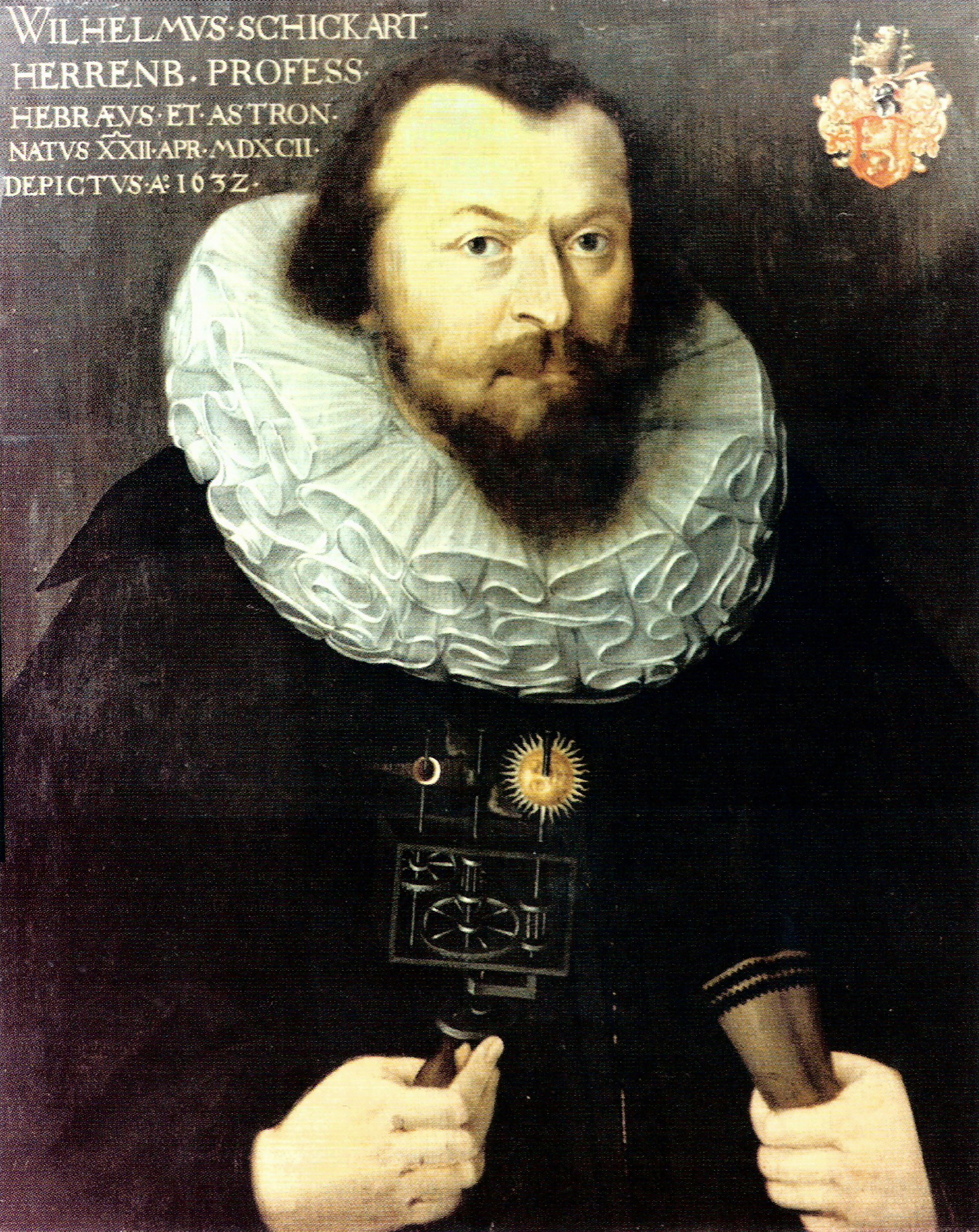
Wilhelm Schickard, 1632

- Johannes Valentinus Andreae (1586–1654), a German theologian, linked with Rosicrucianism
- Wilhelm Schickard (1592–1635), professor of Hebrew and astronomy
- Johann Conrad Klemm (1655–1717), a Lutheran theologian
- Conrad Weiser (1696–1760), a Pennsylvania Dutch pioneer, interpreter and diplomat
- Hubertus Prinz von Sachsen-Coburg und Gotha (born 1961), landed aristocrat
- Tatjana Piotrowski (born 1968), molecular geneticist who researches zebrafish

=== Sport ===
- Karl Link (born 1942), racing cyclist, team gold medallist at the 1964 Summer Olympics
- Kim Kulig (born 1990), retired footballer, played 33 games for Germany women's national football team
- Manuel Bihr (born 1993) footballer, has played 21 games for the Thailand national football team

== Twin towns – sister cities ==
Herrenberg is twinned with:

- Fidenza, Italy
- Tarare, France
