= Böblingen (Landtag electoral district) =

State electoral district of Germany

5: Böblingen
- Electoral district for the Landtag of Baden-Württemberg
- Böblingen in 2026
- District: Böblingen
- Electorate: 131,505 (2026)
- Major settlements: Altdorf, Böblingen, Ehningen, Gärtringen, Hildrizhausen, Holzgerlingen, Magstadt, Schönaich, Sindelfingen, Waldenbuch, and Weil im Schönbuch

Current electoral district
- Created: 2026
- Party: CDU
- Member: Regina Dvořák-Vučetić

Böblingen is an electoral constituency (German: Wahlkreis) represented in the Landtag of Baden-Württemberg. Since 2021, it has elected one member via first-past-the-post voting. Voters cast a second vote under which additional seats are allocated proportionally state-wide. Under the constituency numbering system, it is designated as constituency 5. It is wholly within the district of Böblingen.

== Geography ==
The constituency includes the municipalities of Altdorf, Böblingen, Ehningen, Gärtringen, Hildrizhausen, Holzgerlingen, Magstadt, Schönaich, Sindelfingen, Waldenbuch, and Weil im Schönbuch, within the district of Böblingen.

There were 131,505 eligible voters in 2026.

== Members ==
=== First mandate ===
Both prior to and since the electoral reforms for the 2026 election, the winner of the plurality of the vote (first-past-the-post) in every constituency won the first mandate.

Election	Member	Party	%
1976	Arthur Gruber	CDU	
Sept 1979	Eugen Klunzinger	CDU	
1980	Eugen Klunzinger	CDU	
1984	Eugen Klunzinger	CDU	
1988	Eugen Klunzinger	CDU	
1992	Eugen Klunzinger	CDU	
1996	Eugen Klunzinger	CDU	
2001	Eugen Klunzinger	CDU	
2006	Paul Nemeth	CDU	43.5
2011	Paul Nemeth	CDU	41.1
2016	Thekla Walker	Green	27.7
2021	Thekla Walker	Green	31.4
2026	Regina Dvořák-Vučetić	CDU	26.6

=== Second mandate ===
Prior to the electoral reforms for the 2026 election, the seats in the state parliament were allocated proportionately amongst parties which received more than 5% of valid votes across the state. The seats that were won proportionally for parties that did not win as many first mandates as seats they were entitled to, were allocated to their candidates which received the highest proportion of the vote in their respective constituencies. This meant that following some elections, a constituency would have one or more members elected under a second mandate.

Prior to 2011, these second mandates were allocated to the party candidates who got the greatest number of votes, whilst from 2011-2021, these were allocated according to percentage share of the vote.

Election	Member	Party	Member	Party
1976	Erwin Lamparter	SPD		
1980	Hans Dieter Köder	SPD		
1984	Hans Dieter Köder	SPD		
1988	Hans Dieter Köder	SPD		
1992	Hans Dieter Köder	SPD	Reinhard Hackl	Grüne
1996	Stephan Braun	SPD	Reinhard Hackl	Grüne
May 2000	Stephan Braun	SPD	Marianne Jäger	Grüne
2001	Stephan Braun	SPD		
2006	Stephan Braun	SPD		
2011	Florian Wahl	SPD		
2016			Paul Nemeth	CDU
Jan 2018	Markus Widenmeyer	AfD	Paul Nemeth	CDU
Feb 2018	Harald Pfeiffer	AfD	Paul Nemeth	CDU
Nov 2019	Harald Pfeiffer	IND	Paul Nemeth	CDU
2021	Florian Wahl	SPD	Matthias Miller	CDU

== Election results ==
=== 2026 election ===
State election (2026): Böblingen
Notes:	Blue background denotes the winner of the electorate vote. Pink background denotes a candidate elected from their party list. Yellow background denotes an electorate win by a list member, or other incumbent. A ✓ or ✗ denotes status of any incumbent, win or lose respectively.						
Party	Candidate	Votes	%	±%	Party votes	%	±%
CDU	Regina Dvořák-Vučetić	26,816	30.6	▲5.3	26,887	30.6	▲5.3
Greens	✗ Thekla Walker	23,258	26.6	▼4.8	28,128	32.0	▲0.7
AfD	Christine Schäfer	15,364	17.5	▲8.1	15,261	17.4	▲8.0
SPD	Florian Wahl	11,596	13.2	▲0.2	5,145	5.9	▼7.2
FDP	Christine Watrinet	4,633	5.3	▼6.1	4,194	4.8	▼6.7
Left	Marcel Kläger	2,985	3.4	▲1.1	2,952	3.4	▲1.0
FW					1,470	1.7	▼0.9
BSW	Benjamin Salameh	1,476	1.7		1,333	1.5	
Volt	Patrick Kulinski	980	1.1	▲0.7	603	0.7	▲0.2
APT					553	0.6	
Independent	Kai Hammami	452	0.5				
PARTEI					242	0.3	▼1.1
Bündnis C					230	0.3	
Team Todenhöfer					201	0.2	
Values					189	0.2	
dieBasis					123	0.1	
ÖDP					96	0.1	▼0.4
Pensioners					93	0.1	
PdF					50	0.1	
Verjüngungsforschung					44	0.1	
Humanists					26	0.0	
KlimalisteBW					25	0.0	▼0.5
Informal votes		733			448		
Total valid votes		87,560			87,845		
Turnout		88,293	67.1	▲3.8			
CDU gain from Greens	Majority	3,558	4.0				

=== 2021 election ===
State election (2026): Böblingen
Party	Candidate	Votes	%	±%
Greens	Thelka Walker	25,639	31.4	▲3.7
CDU	Matthias Miller	20,709	25.3	▼2.3
SPD	Florian Wahl	10,700	13.1	▼0.7
FDP	Oliver Alber	9,338	11.4	▲2.5
AfD	Klaus Mauch	7,694	9.4	▼7.1
FW	Ralf Wendel	2,084	2.5	
Left	Utz Mörbe	1,908	2.3	▼0.1
PARTEI	Sebastian Heinkele	1,097	1.3	▲0.6
WiR2020	Hans-Peter Fuger	749	0.9	
Independent	Fred Nestele	647	0.8	
ÖDP	Maria Berger-Senn	410	0.5	
KlimalisteBW	Marco Cinquemani	404	0.5	
Volt	Birgit Seibel	357	0.4	
Majority		4,930	6.1	
Rejected ballots		469	0.6	▼0.2
Turnout		82,205	63.3	▼7.9
Registered electors		129,808		
Greens hold		Swing		

== See also ==
- Politics of Baden-Württemberg
- Landtag of Baden-Württemberg
