= Leonberg (electoral district) =

State electoral district of Germany

6: Leonberg
- Electoral district for the Landtag of Baden-Württemberg
- Leonberg in 2026
- District: Böblingen
- Electorate: 132,021 (2026)
- Major settlements: Aidlingen, Bondorf, Deckenpfronn, Gäufelden, Grafenau, Herrenberg, Jettingen, Leonberg, Mötzingen, Nufringen, Renningen, Rutesheim, Weil der Stadt, and Weissach

Current electoral district
- Party: CDU
- Member: Albrecht Stickel

Leonberg is an electoral constituency (German: ahlkreis) represented in the Landtag of Baden-Württemberg. Since 2026, it has elected one member via first-past-the-post voting. Voters cast a second vote under which additional seats are allocated proportionally state-wide. Under the constituency numbering system, it is designated as constituency 6. It is wholly within the district of Böblingen.

== Geography ==
The constituency includes the municipalities of Aidlingen, Bondorf, Deckenpfronn, Gäufelden, Grafenau, Herrenberg, Jettingen, Leonberg, Mötzingen, Nufringen, Renningen, Rutesheim, Weil der Stadt, and Weissach, within the district of Böblingen.

There were 132,021 eligible voters in 2026.

== Members ==
=== First mandate ===
Both prior to and since the electoral reforms for the 2026 election, the winner of the plurality of the vote (first-past-the-post) in every constituency won the first mandate.

| Election | Member | Party | % |
|---|---|---|---|
| 1976 | Rudolf Decker | CDU | |
| 1980 | Rudolf Decker | CDU | |
| 1984 | Rudolf Decker | CDU | |
| 1988 | Rudolf Decker | CDU | |
| 1992 | Wolfgang Rückert | CDU | |
| 1996 | Wolfgang Rückert | CDU | |
| 2001 | Wolfgang Rückert | CDU | |
| 2006 | Sabine Kurtz | CDU | 42.7 |
| 2011 | Sabine Kurtz | CDU | 39.1 |
| 2016 | Bernd Murschel | Green | 31.9 |
| 2021 | Peter Seimer | Green | 32.7 |
| 2026 | Albrecht Stickel | CDU | 34.8 |

=== Second mandate ===
Prior to the electoral reforms for the 2026 election, the seats in the state parliament were allocated proportionately amongst parties which received more than 5% of valid votes across the state. The seats that were won proportionally for parties that did not win as many first mandates as seats they were entitled to, were allocated to their candidates which received the highest proportion of the vote in their respective constituencies. This meant that following some elections, a constituency would have one or more members elected under a second mandate.

Prior to 2011, these second mandates were allocated to the party candidates who got the greatest number of votes, whilst from 2011-2021, these were allocated according to percentage share of the vote.

| Election | Member | Party | Member | Party | Member | Party |
|---|---|---|---|---|---|---|
| 1976 | Werner Grunert | SPD | | | | |
| 1980 | Werner Grunert | SPD | Oskar Marczy | FDP | | |
| 1984 | Werner Grunert | SPD | | | Joachim Schütz | Grüne |
| 1988 | Birgit Kipfer | SPD | | | | |
| 1992 | Birgit Kipfer | SPD | Richard Eckert | REP | Johannes Buchter | Grüne |
| 1996 | Birgit Kipfer | SPD | Heiderose Berroth | FDP | Johannes Buchter | Grüne |
| 2001 | Birgit Kipfer | SPD | Heiderose Berroth | FDP | | |
| 2006 | Birgit Kipfer | SPD | Heiderose Berroth | FDP | Bernd Murschel | Grüne |
| 2011 | | | | | Bernd Murschel | Grüne |
| 2016 | Sabine Kurtz | CDU | | | | |
| 2021 | Sabine Kurtz | CDU | Hans Dieter Scheerer | FDP | | |

== Election results ==
=== 2026 election ===
State election (2026): Leonberg
| Notes: | Blue background denotes the winner of the electorate vote. Pink background denotes a candidate elected from their party list. Yellow background denotes an electorate win by a list member, or other incumbent. A ✓ or ✗ denotes status of any incumbent, win or lose respectively. | | | | | | |
| Party | Candidate | Votes | % | ±% | Party votes | % | ±% |
|---|---|---|---|---|---|---|---|
| CDU | Albrecht Stickel | 33,433 | 34.8 | ▲8.8 | 29,800 | 30.9 | ▲5.0 |
| Greens | ✗ Peter Seimer | 27,603 | 28.7 | ▼4.0 | 32,455 | 33.7 | ▲0.9 |
| AfD | Andreas Auer | 15,597 | 16.2 | ▲8.0 | 15,745 | 16.3 | ▲8.1 |
| SPD | Farina Semler | 6,174 | 6.4 | ▼4.2 | 4,257 | 4.4 | ▼6.2 |
| FDP | Hans Dieter Scheerer | 5,709 | 5.9 | ▼5.7 | 4,954 | 5.1 | ▼6.5 |
| FW | Ingolf Welte | 4,145 | 4.3 | ▲0.8 | 2,111 | 2.2 | ▼1.3 |
| Left | Thomas Walz | 3,478 | 3.6 | ▲1.3 | 2,981 | 3.1 | ▲0.8 |
| BSW | | | | | 1,178 | 1.2 | |
| Volt | | | | | 699 | 0.7 | ▲0.2 |
| APT | | | | | 672 | 0.7 | |
| PARTEI | | | | | 316 | 0.3 | ▼1.1 |
| Bündnis C | | | | | 282 | 0.3 | |
| Values | | | | | 217 | 0.2 | |
| ÖDP | | | | | 164 | 0.2 | ▼0.5 |
| Team Todenhöfer | | | | | 140 | 0.1 | |
| dieBasis | | | | | 132 | 0.1 | ▼0.6 |
| Pensioners | | | | | 122 | 0.1 | |
| PdF | | | | | 72 | 0.1 | |
| Verjüngungsforschung | | | | | 52 | 0.1 | |
| Humanists | | | | | 36 | 0.0 | |
| KlimalisteBW | | | | | 35 | 0.0 | ▼0.6 |
| Informal votes | | 665 | | | 384 | | |
| Total valid votes | | 96,139 | | | 96,420 | | |
| Turnout | | 96,804 | 73.3 | ▲4.6 | | | |
| CDU gain from Greens | Majority | 5,830 | 6.1 | | | | |

=== 2021 election ===
State election (2026): Leonberg
| Party | Candidate | Votes | % | ±% |
|---|---|---|---|---|
| Greens | Peter Seimer | 29,124 | 32.7 | ▲0.8 |
| CDU | Sabine Kurtz | 23,108 | 26.0 | ▼1.4 |
| FDP | Hans Dieter Scheerer | 10,393 | 11.7 | ▲2.2 |
| SPD | Jan Hambach | 9,438 | 10.6 | ▼0.7 |
| AfD | Peter Keßler | 7,329 | 8.2 | ▼6.7 |
| FW | Dieter Seipler | 3,137 | 3.5 | |
| Left | Robert Schacht | 2,082 | 2.3 | ▲0.1 |
| PARTEI | Jessica Emminghaus | 1,255 | 1.4 | |
| dieBasis | Kurt Ebert | 668 | 0.8 | |
| ÖDP | Joachim Paret | 620 | 0.7 | Steady |
| WiR2020 | Anja Stäbler | 647 | 0.7 | |
| KlimalisteBW | Guido Mennicken | 582 | 0.7 | |
| Volt | Jonathan Messinger | 471 | 0.5 | |
| One for All (Eine für Alle) | Jürgen Mögel | 178 | 0.2 | |
| Majority | | 6,016 | 6.7 | |
| Rejected ballots | | 462 | 0.5 | ▼0.3 |
| Turnout | | 89,494 | 68.7 | ▼6.4 |
| Registered electors | | 130,289 | | |
| Greens hold | | Swing | | |

== See also ==
- Politics of Baden-Württemberg
- Landtag of Baden-Württemberg
