= Schwippe =

River in Germany

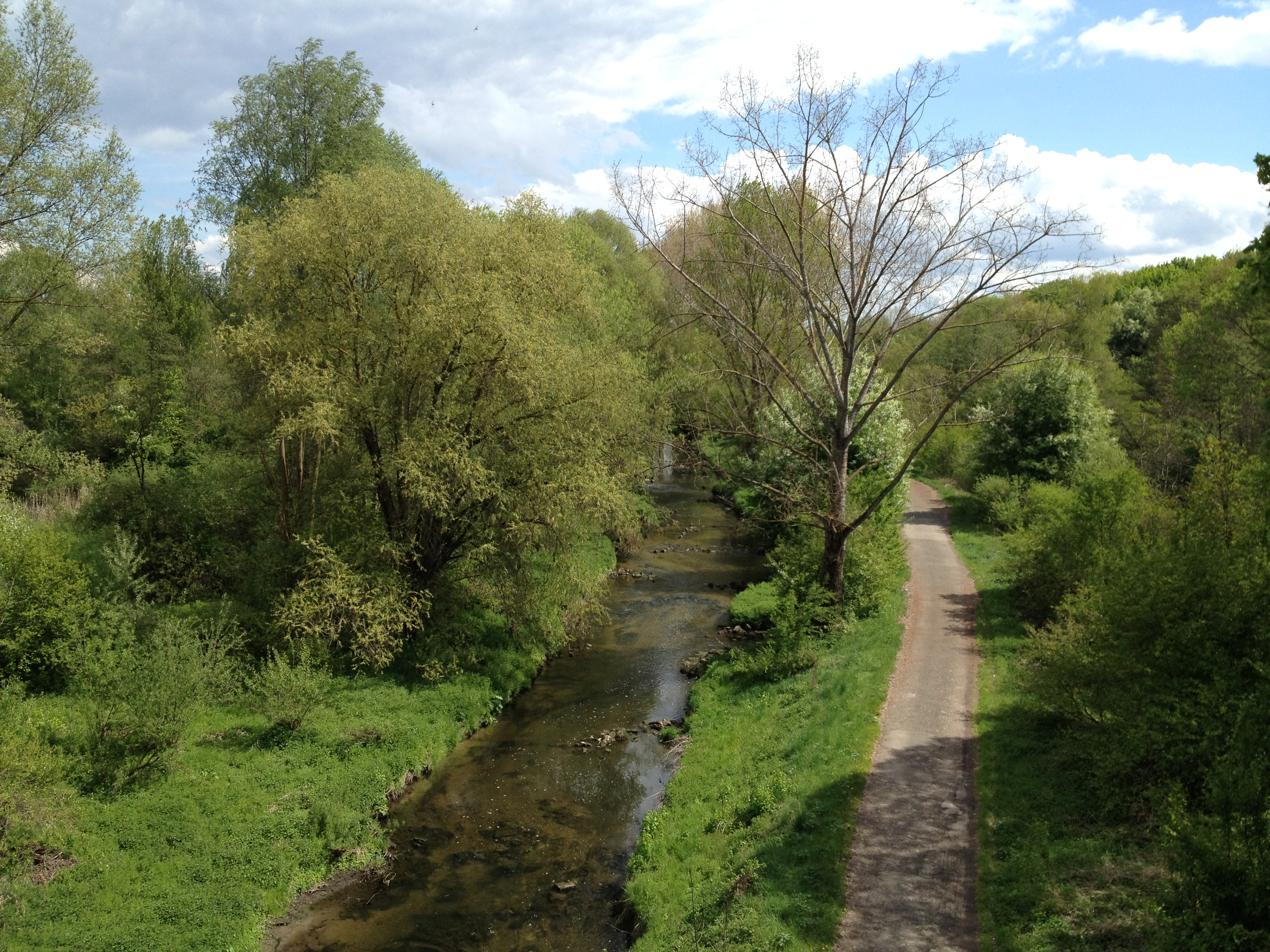

Location
- Country: Germany
- State: Baden-Württemberg

Physical characteristics
- Mouth
  - location: Würm
  - coordinates: 48.7179°N 8.8999°E
- Length: 18.0 km (11.2 mi)

Basin features
- Progression: Würm→ Nagold→ Enz→ Neckar→ Rhine→ North Sea

Schwippe is a river of Baden-Württemberg, Germany. The Schwippe is an 18 km (11 mi) long tributary of the Würm in Baden-Württemberg and rises in Sindelfingen. Along the river are the towns of Dagersheim, Darmsheim and Grafenau. Smaller rivers flowing into the Schwippe include the Goldbach, Murken Bach, Aischbach, Hulbgraben and Buchentalgraben.

== See also ==
- List of rivers of Baden-Württemberg
