= Weil im Schönbuch =

- Municipality
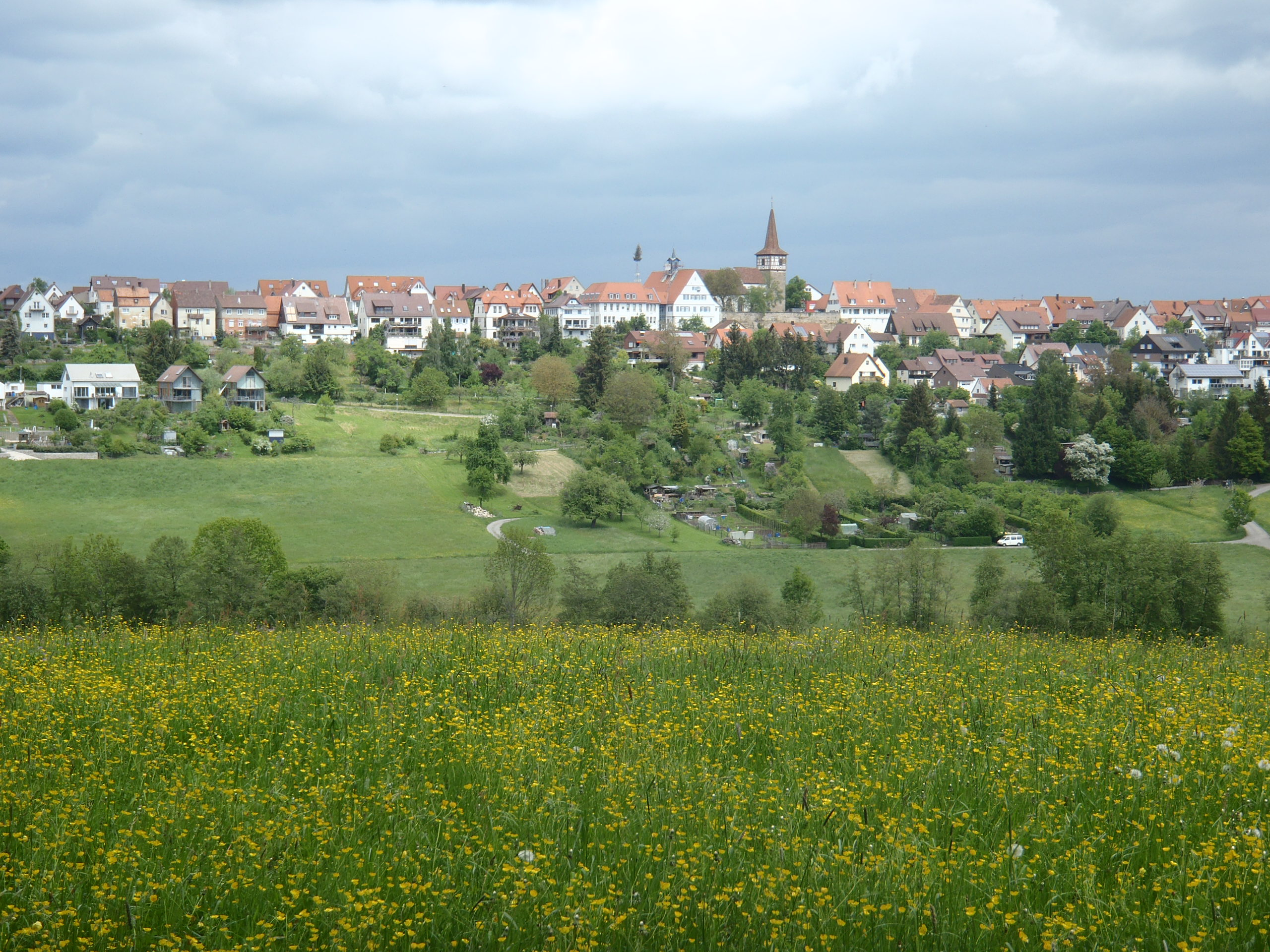
- View towards Weil im Schönbuch

- Coat of arms

- Location of Weil im Schönbuch within Böblingen district
- Interactive map of Weil im Schönbuch
- Location within Germany Location within Baden-Württemberg
- Coordinates: 48°37′17″N 9°3′40″E
- Country: Germany
- State: Baden-Württemberg
- Admin. region: Stuttgart
- District: Böblingen
- Subdivisions: 6

Government
  - Mayor (2020–28): Wolfgang Lahl

Area
  - Total: 26.12 km^{2} (10.08 sq mi)
- Elevation: 482 m (1,581 ft)

Population (2025-12-31)
  - Total: 9,987
  - Density: 382.4/km^{2} (990.3/sq mi)
- Time zone: UTC+01:00 (CET)
  - Summer (DST): UTC+02:00 (CEST)
- Postal codes: 71093
- Dialling codes: 07157, 07031
- Vehicle registration: BB
- Website: www.weil-im-schoenbuch.de

Weil im Schönbuch ((German pronunciation: [ˈvaɪ̯l ʔɪm ˈʃøːnˌbuːx]), lit. 'Weil in the Schönbuch') is a municipality in the Böblingen district, middle Neckar region, Stuttgart governmental district, Baden-Württemberg, Germany. Its name is derived from the presence of a Roman villa in the area. Two smaller villages, Neuweiler and Breitenstein, are incorporated into Weil im Schönbuch. Portions of the Schönbuch Natural Park belong to Weil im Schönbuch; the forested park has many scenic paths, ponds, streams and protected areas for animals and rare plants.

== Geography ==
Weil im Schönbuch is located 12 km south of Böblingen in a clearing of the Schönbuch forest on the northern edge of the Schönbuch Nature Park. Highway B464, which links Böblingen and Tübingen, runs through the western edge of the town.

The oldest parts of the town are located on an east-west ridge. To the immediate north are two small brooks, the Seitenbach and the Totenbach, and to the south is a more substantial stream, the Schaich. The village has expanded along the northern slope of the ridge. The steep southern slopes remain largely undeveloped. Elevations in the town range from 432 to 487 meters.

Towns surrounding Weil im Schönbuch are, starting from the north and moving clockwise, Schönaich, Waldenbuch, Dettenhausen, the Bebenhausen district of Tübingen, Altdorf, and Holzgerlingen.

== History ==
Traces of human activity in the area have been dated to the Neolithic and Bronze Age. A Roman settlement was established in the first century C.E. and a villa rustica was excavated near the Totenbachmühle. More Roman artifacts were discovered during renovation of the St. Martin’s church in 1904. A 90-cm-high statue of Diana was found in the town.

In the 4th century the Alamanni settled in the oldest part of the village, today's Maierhof. It is not certain whether the area was continuously inhabited after that. In 1087 was the first recorded mention of the area when a Rudolf of Breitenstein was listed as a vassal of the Counts Palatinate of Tübingen. In 1188 the town was mentioned for the first time as Weyl im Schaienbuch. In that year Count Rudolf I of Tübingen gave his share of the village to the Bebenhausen Abbey, which had been founded one year previously. The Fronhof (Maierhof), together with the serfs belonging to it, remained with his brother. By the end of the 13th century, Weil im Schönbuch, Breitenstein, and Neuweiler (mentioned for the first time in 1295) were almost completely within the territory of the Bebenhausen abbey.

The night of May 11, 1525, the Swabian League army, under its leader George, Truchsess of Waldburg, camped in the Seitenbach and Totenbach dales. The next day it advanced on Böblingen, massacring thousands of peasants in the Battle of Böblingen, one of the bloodiest conflicts of the German Peasants' War.

During the Reformation, the Bebenhausen abbey was dissolved in 1535 and Weil im Schönbuch acquired by Ulrich, Duke of Württemberg. In 1559 the whole town, including the church and city hall, was destroyed by arson. The only building that survived the disaster was the parsonage, somewhat removed from the rest of the town. The arsonist, Enderlin Seitz, was captured and condemned to death. As punishment, Seitz was forced into a barrel into which long nails had been started, and the barrel rolled down a hill. The nails were naturally driven into the barrel and killed the arsonist. In the Thirty Years War, Imperial-Catholic troops pillaged the town after the battle of Nördlingen on September 8, 1634, and, in 1635, a further disaster occurred with an outbreak of the plague. Nearly a third of the population of village lost their lives in this war.

By 1850 Weil im Schönbuch contained 2453 Protestant and 21 Catholic inhabitants, who lived and worked in 287 main and 165 auxiliary buildings. At that time, Weil was the third-largest town (after Sindelfingen and Böblingen) in the Böblingen Oberamt (not identical with today’s Landkreis Böblingen).

In the last days of the Second World War, Weil im Schönbuch was the scene of heavy fighting between German and French troops on April 21 and 22, 1945. Some of the local population were killed and 58 buildings were destroyed.

As a result of municipal reform in Baden-Württemberg, the villages of Neuweiler (July 1, 1971) and Breitenstein (April 1, 1972) were merged into Weil im Schönbuch.

== Population ==
The numbers of inhabitants come from census results (marked in red) or the official estimates of the bureau of statistics (main domiciles only). All data since 1871 were reported by the Baden-Wuerttemberg bureau of statistics [5]; data from 1850 to 1871 are from the Oberamt Böblingen [4].

== Politics ==
=== Community structure ===
Weil im Schönbuch consists of the three districts: Breitenstein; Neuweiler; and Weil im Schönbuch. The districts were merged in the early 70's. Breitenstein and Neuweiler are considered Ortschaften (localities) under the Baden-Württemberg municipal code with their own village councils and mayors. The Breitenstein district contains only the village of Breitenstein. The Neuweiler district contains the village of Neuweiler and the Eschmühle farm. The Weil im Schönbuch district includes the town proper and the Upper Rauhmühle, Lower Rauhmühle, and Totenbachmühle farms.

=== Town council ===
The town council comprises 20 members as of the last local election on June 7, 2009. The election turnout was 56.75%. The election had the following outcome.

CDU	7 Seats	(32.28%)
WAB^{1}	5 Seats	(25.72%)
UBW^{2}	4 Seats	(19.40%)
SPD	2 Seats	(11.65%)
FWV^{3}	2 Seats	(10.95%)

Chairman of the town council is the mayor.

=== Coat of arms ===
A red stag with golden antlers springing on a green hill between two green beeches with a silver background.

=== Partner Cities ===
Since 1976 the village of Neuweiler has been partnered with Hennersdorf in Austria.

== Economy and Infrastructure ==
=== Traffic ===
Weil im Schönbuch is connected to highway B464 by county road (Kreisstrasse) K1062. K1048 connects it to Holzgerlingen and Schönaich, K1050 to Waldenbuch, and K1062 to Dettenhausen. K1049 connects to the villages of Neuweiler and Breitenstein and K 1058 connects the suburb of Roter Berg with Weil im Schönbuch and B464. In December 1996 the Schönbuchbahn (Böblingen-Dettenhausen) was put back into operation. Three stops in Weil im Schönbuch connect the town through Böblingen to the Stuttgart regional rail network.

=== Local industries ===
- Hecker Werke GmbH & Co. Rubber and sealing articles
- KLW Karl Lutz GmbH. Workshop and office equipment
- Brose Fahrzeugteile GmbH & CO. Automotive
- Franz Hahn. Lumber and building materials transportation
- Stähli Läpp-Technik GmbH. Polishing and knife sharpening equipment

== Education ==
Primary schools (Grundschulen) are located in Weil im Schönbuch, Breitenstein, and Neuweiler. The schools in Breitenstein and Neuweiler offer only the first two years of education. A secondary school (Hauptschule) is located in Weil im Schönbuch.

== Culture ==
=== Festivals ===
The Seenachtsfest (Lake-night Fest) is organized by the volunteer fire department at the fire-brigade lake just outside town. This celebration takes place on the first Saturday in August.

The town singing club (Gesangverein) holds a singing carnival on a yearly basis.

=== Sport ===
Artistic cycling is well known in the area. Weil im Schönbuch resident Astrid Ruckaberle was the women’s world champion in artistic cycling in 2000, 2001, and 2003.

=== Music ===
Weil im Schönbuch contains several musical groups.

- Gesangverein Weil im Schönbuch, founded in 1850 as the Liederkranz. Offers a mixed choir, and a pop choir
- Musikverein Original Schönbuchmusikanten Weil im Schönbuch, founded in 1931. The club has a youth band and a senior band. This provides a way for beginners to learn music.
- Junges Streichorchester Weil im Schönbuch, founded in 1995. Three orchestras exist at present, the Kinderorchester (children’s orchestra), the Jugendorchester (youth orchestra), and the Streichorchester (string orchestra), as well as a cello ensemble.
- Harmonika-Freunde Weil im Schönbuch (https://www.hfw-is.de), founded in 1964. The club offers accordion, guitar, and keyboard instruction. It cooperates with local schools in Weil im Schönbuch, Breitenstein and Neuweiler to offer musical education.
- b!cause, a choir founded in 1981 focusing on gospel, pop, and soul music.

== Religion ==
Weil im Schönbuch contains Protestant, Catholic, and New Apostolic congregations. There are no Islamic houses of worship in the town.

== Notable Persons ==
- Florian Toncar (born October 18, 1979). German politician (FDP) and member of the German Bundestag.
- Erich Hartmann (born April 19, 1922, in Weissach, died September 20, 1993, in Weil im Schönbuch) was a Luftwaffe pilot in World War 2. With 352 confirmed kills, he was the most successful fighter pilot in the history of air combat.
