= Peter Seimer =

German politician (born 1993)

Member of the Landtag of Baden-Württemberg
- Incumbent
- Assumed office 11 May 2021
- Constituency: Leonberg (2021–2026)

Personal details
- Born: 19 September 1993 (age 32)
- Party: Alliance 90/The Greens (since 2013)

Peter Seimer (born 19 September 1993) is a German politician serving as a member of the Landtag of Baden-Württemberg since 2021. From 2015 to 2018, he served as spokesperson of Alliance 90/The Greens in Böblingen.
