= Der Container Exklusiv =

Der Container Exklusiv is a 2006 German reality television series which imitated the format of Big Brother Germany. There were 18 contestants (see below: Nominations). The show was broadcast on Premiere channel, which is the broadcaster that showed the 24-hour streaming of German Big Brother, and produced by Endemol. The show began on 27 February 2006 and was meant to finish on 31 July 2006 (155 days), but due to poor ratings/subscriber levels, the show finished officially on 5 June 2006 (99 days), with final rounds of votes among all who remained. The prize for the winner was 150,000 Euro originally, but due to the shortened season, the final prize was 100,000 Euro (about US$140,000). The presenter was Christian Möllmann, a housemate in BB2 Germany. They used house number 9 from Big Brother Germany 6. The show started with 6 Housemates, adding a few each month. Nominations took place on Mondays, at 2-week intervals. Each Housemate nominated 1 person. Evictions were on alternate Mondays to the nominations, and the evicted Housemate was decided by a public vote of TV viewers.

== Concept ==
After the station RTL II decision to end Big Brother Germany, after the sixth season (before deciding to return with season 7 in 2007), Premiere and Endemol decided to jointly market its own season of the format under a different name. It tried to focus too heavily on the early seasons of Big Brother Germany.

Just as in the fifth and sixth seasons of Big Brother Germany, the video feed for Der Container Exklusiv was broadcast 24 hours live on a private, fee-based television channel. From 4 April 2006, a channel excluding the so-called happy hour from 17:00-18:00, unlocked viewing for all its customers. There have also been on the TV channel Premiere, daily shows at 20:00 clock to see the daily highlights from Der Container and each week on Mondays at 20:15 some highlights (with weekly nomination, or an excerpt). The shows were hosted by Christian Möllmann.

=== Premises ===
The venues of Der Container Exklusiv were the exclusive premises of the Big Brother village in Ossendorf. There also, the sixth season of the German Big Brother was produced. After the end of first premiere recordings beamed from the casting of the container from exclusive. On 27 February 2006 from 1:00 clock then went the first six residents at number seven - the former assistant area - a. In subsequent weeks, the number of residents increased to ten and on 10 March, the parade took place in the actual "container" instead. This lasted for number 9 - the former head of the field - including the garden with a swimming pool, the former Big Bar and the gym. The Big Bar was transformed into the bedroom, and the bedroom of the former Big Brother residents into the dining room. For the final broadcast on 5 June, it was used as the fitness studio.

=== Supervision of residents ===
As with the Big Brother format, contestants were also monitored in Der Container Exklusiv around-the-clock by video cameras and microphones. There were camera-free clock hours between 7:00-8:00, and no images were transferred from the bedroom.

=== Number of inhabitants, nominations, winning sum ===
Living together in the container were ten residents. According to a statement which could be provided voluntarily or by eviction, moved to a new resident. Every two weeks, the residents nominated two (possibly with a tie more than two) candidates for expulsion. After this nomination, the audience had a vote by tele-voting. In the weeks following the nomination, then decided the audience via telephone, who of the nominees would remain. The candidate receiving the fewest viewer votes was thrown out then. Towards the end of the season, the number of residents decreased gradually, until eventually a winner - the candidate Sergei - remained. He received a prize of 100,000 euros. Before the announcement of a premature end, Staffell and Endemol/Premiere had promised the winner a sum of €150,000 . However, simultaneously with the announcement of a premature end, without further comments, the earnings premium had been reduced by one third.

=== Budget and weekly tasks ===
The budget, with which each resident had to purchase food and other goods available, was seven euros (~US$10) per inhabitant per day. A share of 20-50%, of this basic budget, they had to use for weekly tasks in which they had to perform, for example, their ability to provide athletic performance or ability to learn a test. When a task was passed, the basic budget was added; otherwise, when a task was failed, the basic budget was subtracted from a player's total.

== Housemates ==
Housemates	Residence	Occupation	Age
(Germany) Andreas Schulze	Nufringen	Former Model	33
(Germany) Anja Kociemba	Eisenbach	Industrial mechanic	22
(Germany) Iris Lauermann, "Crazy"	Cologne	Freelance Musicmanager	30
(Croatia) Davorka Tovilo	Munich	Student	28
(Turkey) Ertu Kile	Tönisvorst	H.P. Employee relationship	25
(Turkey) Hakan Kaveller	Andernach	IT-Electrician	20
(Austria) Jasmin Holzmann	Leoben	Singer	32
(Germany) Jasmin Jennewein, "Jazmin"	Mallorca	Singer / Stripper	27
(Germany) Maik	Hamburg	unemployed	38
(Germany) Mareen Drewes	Essen	Photographer	26
(Poland) Peter Szkatula	Remscheid	Unemployed	28
(Germany) Sandra Wesolek	Berlin	Waitress	27
(Germany) Sela	Herzberg	Sales Clerk	21
(Netherlands) Sergej Janssen	Erkelenz	Unemployed	29
(Turkey) Tanyol Salur	Ratingen		28
(Germany) Thorsten Hoffeld	Lampertheim	Customer service for mail-order firm	31
(Bulgaria) Vesselina Angelova, "Vessy"	Duisburg	Student	22

Entered on Day 1 (26 February 2009):

- Iris "Crazy" Lauermann, 30
- Ertu Kile, 25
- Maik, 38
- Mareen Drewes, 26
- Sandra Wesolek, 27
- Sergej Janssen, 29

New Housemates:
Entered on Day 8 (6 March 2009):

- Jasmin "Jazmin" Jennewein

Entered on Day 15 (13 March):

- Aksana
- Peter
- Tanyol

Entered on Day 22:

- Andreas (replacement for Tanyol)

Entered on Day 25:

- Vesselina "Vessy" Angelova (replacement for Aksana)

Entered on Day 29:

- Hakan Kaveller

Entered on Day 43:

- Davorka Tovilo

Entered on Day 50:

- Jasmin Holzmann (replacement for Maik)

Entered on Day 57:

- Thorsten Hoffeld

Entered on Day 71 (8 May 2009):

- Anja Kociemba

== Nominations ==
	Round 1	Round 2	Round 3	Round 4	Round 5	Round 6	Round 7	Final	
Sergej	Jazmin	Crazy	Andreas; Vessy	Davorka	Banned	Nominated	Nominated	Winner (Day 99)	
Vessy	Not in The House	Andreas	Andreas	Davorka	Ertu	Immune	No; Nominate	Runner-Up (Day 99)	
Hakan	Not in The House	Peter	Andreas	Andreas	Sergej	Immune	Sergej	3rd Place (Day 99)	
Thorsten	Not in The House			Ertu	Ertu	Nominated	No; Nominate	4th Place (Day 99)	
Anja	Not in The House				Ertu	Nominated	Peter	5th Place (Day 99)	
Peter	Crazy	Andreas	Sela	Andreas	Ertu	Immune	Nominated	Evicted (Day 96)	
Sandra	Aksana	Andreas	Andreas	Andreas	Banned	Nominated	Evicted (Day 92)		
Ertu	Crazy	Crazy	Vessy	Davorka	Banned	Evicted (Day 85)			
Jasmin	Not in The House			Sandra	Walked (Day 76)				
Davorka	Not in The House		Vessy	Andreas	Walked (Day 73)				
Andreas	Not in The House	Crazy	Sela	Vessy	Evicted (Day 71)				
Sela	Not in The House		Andreas	Evicted (Day 57)					
Maik	Sergej	Andreas	Evicted (Day 47)						
Crazy	Mareen	Ertu	Evicted (Day 43)						
Jazmin	Mareen	Walked (Day 34)							
Mareen	Jazmin	Evicted (Day 29)							
Aksana	Jazmin	Walked (Day 24)							
Tanyol	Walked (Day 21)								
Walked	Tanyol	Aksana; Jazmin	None		Davorka; Jasmin	None			
Public Nomination	None	Maik (1.2%)	Sela (3.12%)	Hakan (1.4%)	Hakan (3.8%)	None			
Nominated	Mareen (3 votes); Jazmin (2 votes); Crazy (2 votes)	Andreas (4 votes); Crazy (3 votes)	Andreas (5 votes); Sela (3 votes); Vessy (3 votes)	Andreas (4 votes); Davorka (3 votes)	Ertu (4 votes); Hakan (1 vote); Sergej (1 vote)	Anja; Thorsten; Sandra; Sergej	Peter; Sergej	None	
Evicted	Mareen; 20% to save	Crazy; 25.5% to save	Sela; 15.9% to save	Andreas; 44.5% to save	Ertu; 19.8% to save	Sandra; 14.4% to save	Peter; 41.7% to save	Anja; 8% to win (Out of 5)	Thorsten; 13.2% to win (Out of 5)
Evicted	Mareen; 20% to save	Crazy; 25.5% to save	Sela; 15.9% to save	Andreas; 44.5% to save	Ertu; 19.8% to save	Sandra; 14.4% to save	Peter; 41.7% to save	Hakan; 14.6% to win (Out of 3)	Vessy; 32.9% to win
Evicted	Mareen; 20% to save	Crazy; 25.5% to save	Sela; 15.9% to save	Andreas; 44.5% to save	Ertu; 19.8% to save	Sandra; 14.4% to save	Peter; 41.7% to save	Sergej; 67.1% to win	
