= Lehenweiler =

- Ortsteil of Aidlingen
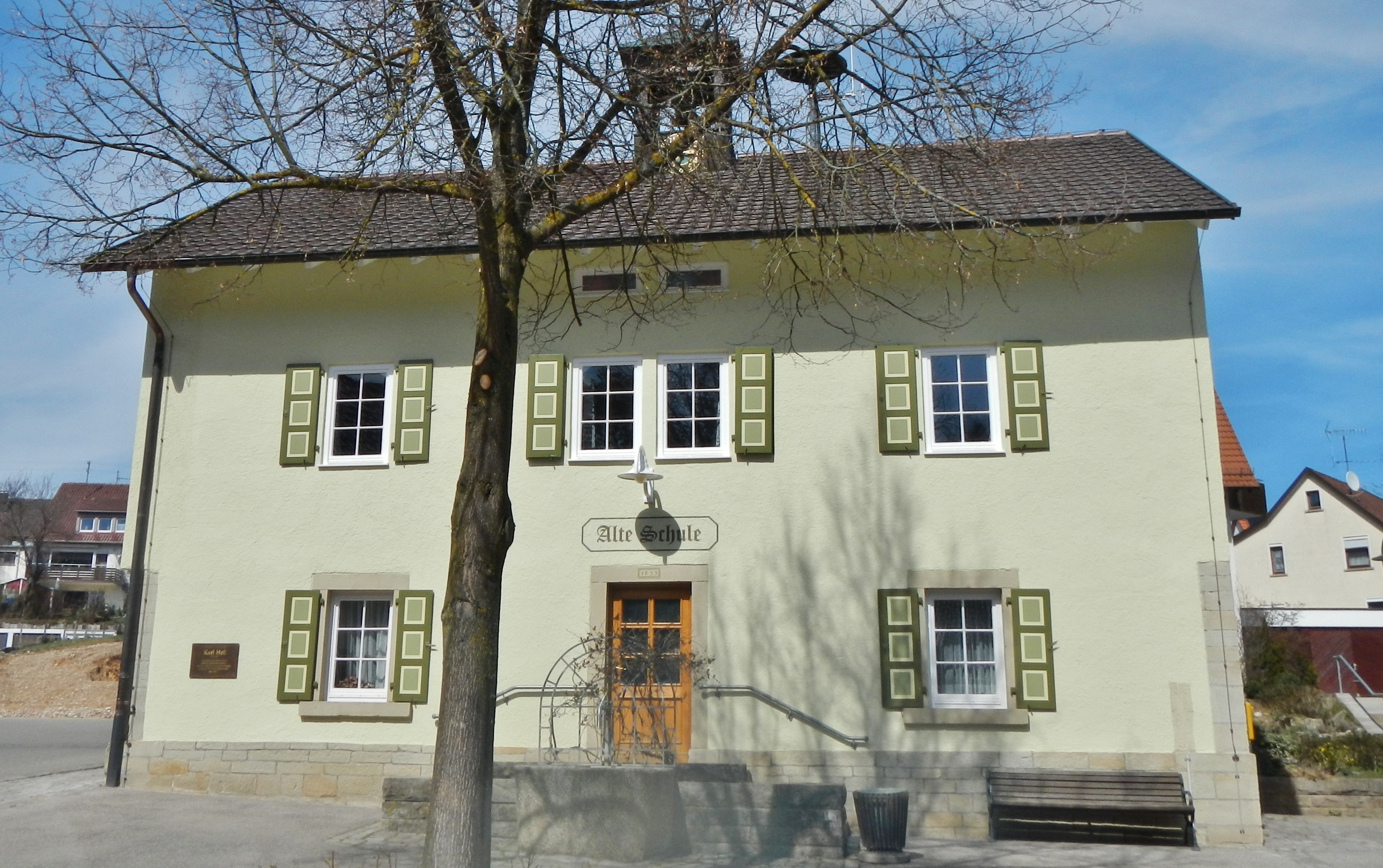
- The Old School
- Interactive map of Lehenweiler
- Location within Germany Location within Baden-Württemberg
- Coordinates: 48°42′02″N 8°53′15″E
- Country: Germany
- State: Baden-Württemberg
- District: Böblingen
- Municipality: Aidlingen

Population (2018-12-31)
  - Total: 529
- Demonym: Laimer
- Time zone: UTC+01:00 (CET)
  - Summer (DST): UTC+02:00 (CEST)
- Postal codes: 71134
- Dialling codes: 07034
- Website: http://www.dg-lehenweiler.de/

Lehenweiler is a hamlet in the municipality of Aidlingen, in the Landkreis (district) of Böblingen, in Baden-Württemberg, Germany. It lies in the landscape region called the Heckengäu.

== History ==
In 1709, Eberhard Louis, Duke of Württemberg granted three favoured knights each 15 morgen - about 4 hectares (9.9 acres) - of land from the fiefdom ("Lehen") of Aidlingen. The second part of the name is "Weiler", which means "hamlet".

== Amenities ==
In the middle of the village is the old school, built in 1813, which is now used as a community centre.

There is a bus connection to Aidlingen and the town of Böblingen, approximately 12 kilometres (7.5 mi) away.
