= Flender =

Flender is a surname. Notable people with the surname include:

- Rodman Flender (born 1962), American actor, writer, director, and producer
- Ulrike Fitzer (born 1982), born Ulrike Flender, German Air Force pilot

== See also ==
- Flender Werke, German shipbuilding company
