= Würm (Nagold) =

River in Germany

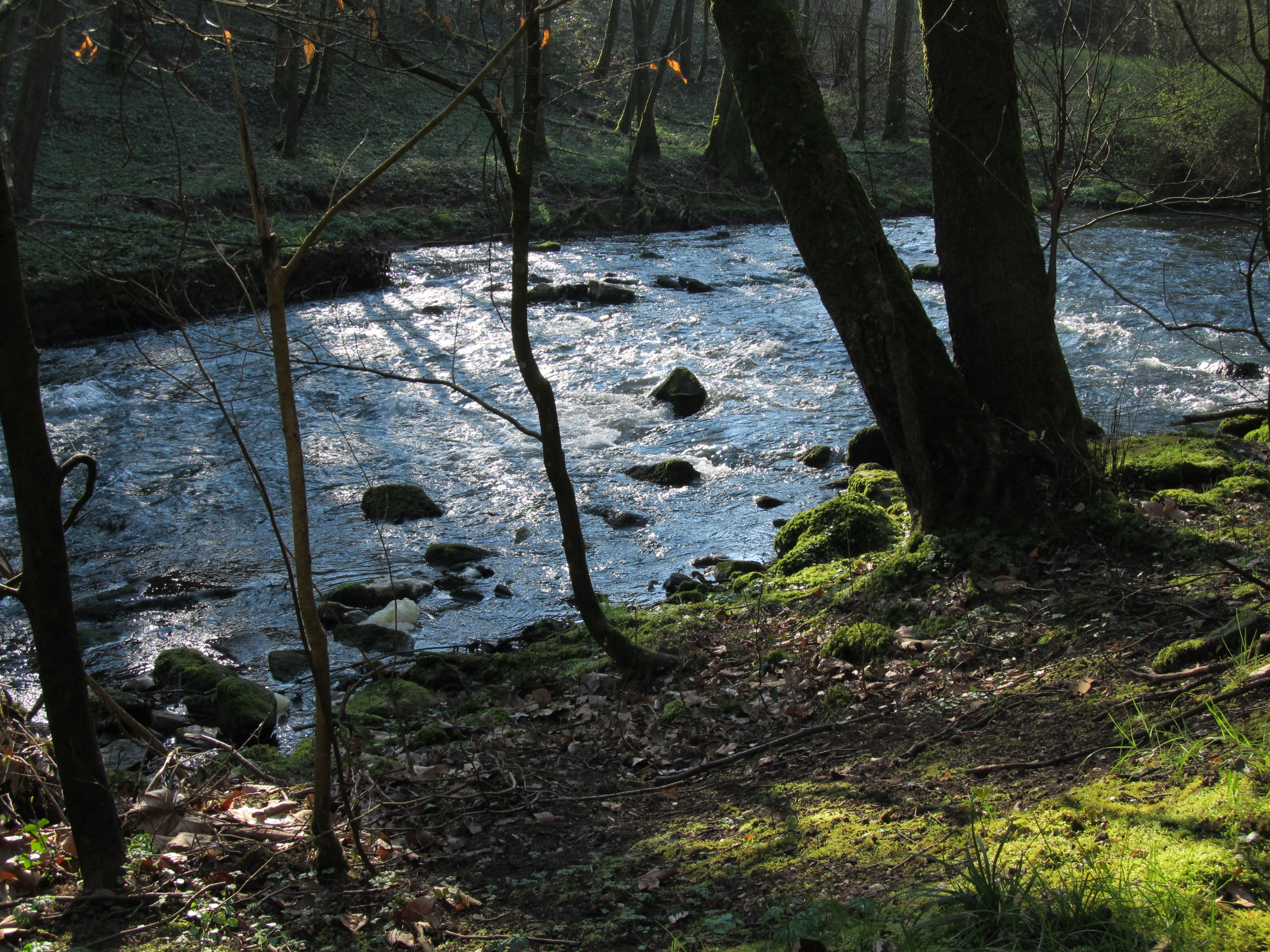

Location
- Country: Germany
- State: Baden-Württemberg

Physical characteristics
- Mouth
  - location: Nagold
  - coordinates: 48.8783°N 8.6986°E
- Length: 53.9 km (33.5 mi)
- Basin size: 418 km^{2} (161 sq mi)

Basin features
- Progression: Nagold→ Enz→ Neckar→ Rhine→ North Sea

The Würm (German pronunciation: [vʏʁm]) is a river of Baden-Württemberg, southwestern Germany. The river is 54 kilometers in length. It is a right tributary of the river Nagold, south of Pforzheim, only 2 kilometers before the Nagold discharges into the Enz.

== Geography ==
Würm in Oberes Würmtal nördlich Hildrizhausen samt dem Talbecken um Mauren zwischen Holzgerlingen und Ehningen.

The Würm begins from two separate streams in the Schönbuch, the Altdorfer Würm south of Altdorf, and the Hildrizhauser Würm south of Hildrizhausen. The river is around 54 kilometers long, and flows northwesterly before emptying directly into the Nagold in Pforzheim, which then empties in the Enz shortly thereafter. The Würm flows through multiple towns, beginning with Altdorf and Hildrizhausen, as well as other towns such as Ehningen, Mauren, Aidlingen, Schafhausen, Weil der Stadt, Merklingen, Hausen an der Würm, Mühlhausen an der Würm, Würm (a town, not the river), and Pforzheim. It also flows directly between Dätzingen and Döffingen in Grafenau.

In 2013, the Würm was altered near Weil der Stadt to allow it to meander more naturally. It had previously been straightened in the area.

In 2012 and 2018, two weirs were dismantled along the Würm in Tiefenbronn and Ehningen, respectively, to allow for better passage of aquatic animals.

=== Wildlife ===
The Würm is home to many bird species, including the common kingfisher, white-throated dipper, little grebe, common sandpiper, and grey wagtail. The reed bunting, common reed warbler, mallard, and common moorhen all breed around parts of the Würm. In the winter, both the jack snipe and common snipe can be found.

The area is also home to many insect species, including the beautiful demoiselle.
