= Grafenau =

Grafenau is the name of two German towns

- Grafenau, Bavaria, a city in the district Freyung-Grafenau
- Grafenau, Württemberg, a municipality in the district of Böblingen, Baden-Württemberg
