= Lerchenberg (Gäu) =

Mountain in Germany

Coordinates: 48°39′47″N 8°47′32″E

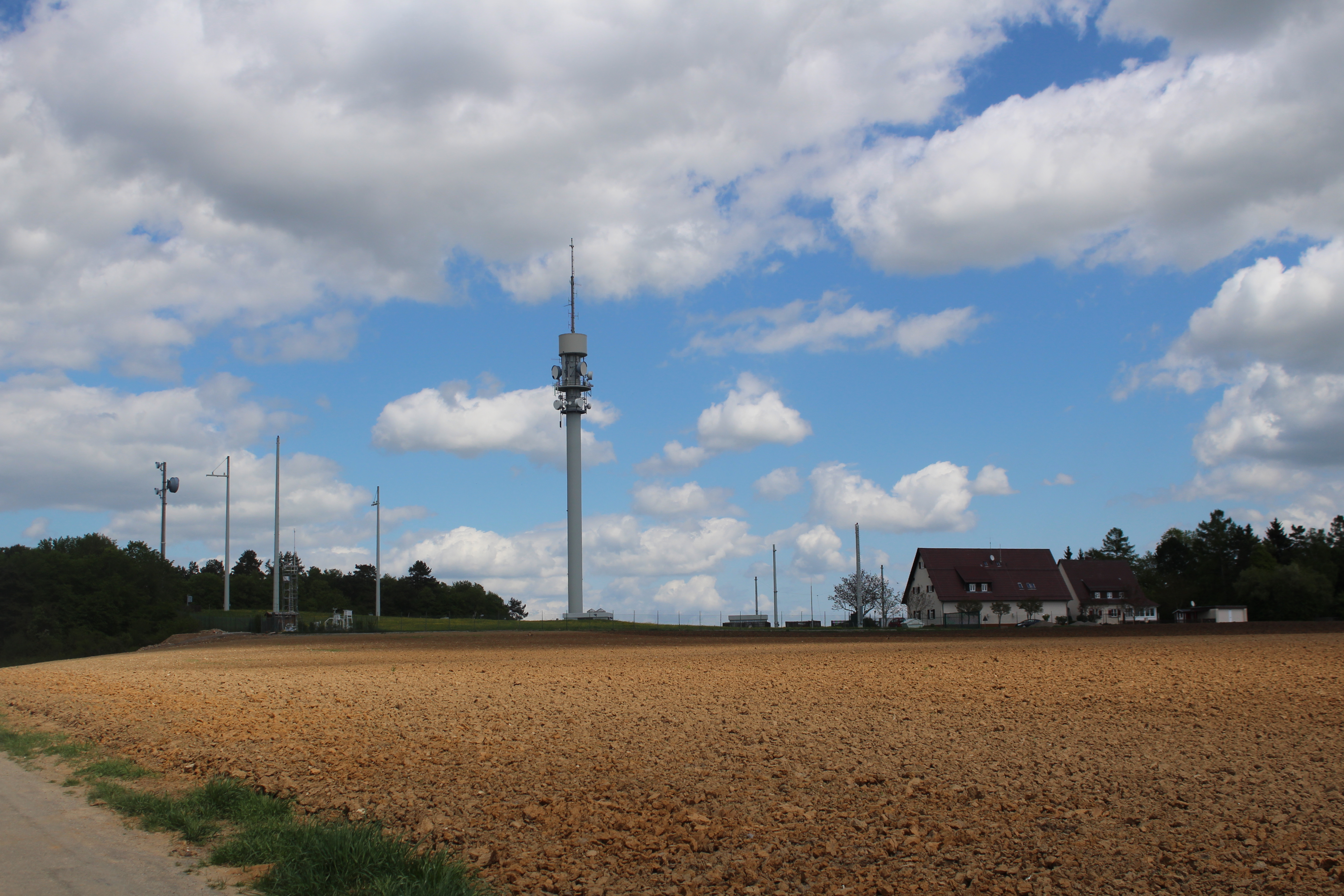
- The Lerchenberg Transmitter

Highest point
- Elevation: 603 m (1,978 ft)

Geography
- Location: Wildberg, Landkreis Calw, Baden-Württemberg, Germany

The Lerchenberg (603 m) is a mountain in the Gäu landscape at the northeastern end of the town of Wildberg in Baden-Württemberg, Germany.

It lies close to the boundary with the parish of Deckenpfronn. On the hilltop is the Lerchenberg Radio Transmitter belonging to the state authorities.
