= Holzgerlingen =

- Town
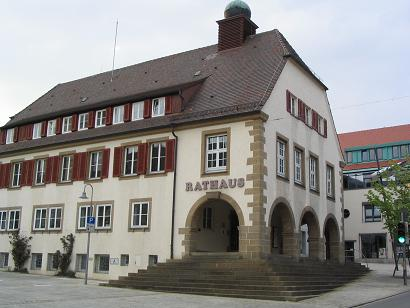
- Town hall

- Coat of arms

- Location of Holzgerlingen within Böblingen district
- Interactive map of Holzgerlingen
- Location within Germany Location within Baden-Württemberg
- Coordinates: 48°38′21″N 9°0′39″E
- Country: Germany
- State: Baden-Württemberg
- Admin. region: Stuttgart
- District: Böblingen
- Subdivisions: 4

Government
  - Mayor (2017–25): Ioannis Delakos

Area
  - Total: 13.39 km^{2} (5.17 sq mi)
- Elevation: 476 m (1,562 ft)

Population (2025-12-31)
  - Total: 14,153
  - Density: 1,057/km^{2} (2,738/sq mi)
- Time zone: UTC+01:00 (CET)
  - Summer (DST): UTC+02:00 (CEST)
- Postal codes: 71088
- Dialling codes: 07031
- Vehicle registration: BB/LEO
- Website: www.holzgerlingen.de

Holzgerlingen (German pronunciation: [hɔlt͡sˈɡɛʁlɪŋən]; Swabian: Holzgerlenge) is a municipality in the German Federal State of Baden-Württemberg. It is located in district of Böblingen.

== Geography ==
Holzgerlingen, with its population of around 14,600, lies in a clearing in the Schönbuch, a large forest in the state of Baden-Württemberg and it is located between the Black Forest and the Swabian Jura. It is 6 km (3.7 mi) south of the city of Böblingen. The old city center lies about 475 metres (1,558 feet) above mean sea level on a watershed. The source of the Aich River is located in the southeast of Holzgerlingen, the Aich is flowing east and feeding the Neckar River at Nürtingen. The source of the Würm River is located west of the city on administrative area of Altdorf, the Würm is flowing westwards merging with the Nagold River and Enz River in Pforzheim.

=== Climate ===
Holzgerlingen, like many cities in southern Germany, and the Schönbuch region particularly, possess a temperate climate with four distinct seasons. Throughout the year, minimal temperatures range from between 3 and 39 °F (−16 and 4 °C) during the night in January and February, the coldest months of the year, to between 65 and 93 °F (18 and 34 °C) during July and August afternoons.

The wettest month of the year is November, when frequent storm systems blowing in off of both the North Sea and the Atlantic Ocean. During November, 5.00 in (127 mm) of precipitation falls, mostly as rain. Snow does fall in the region, but because daytime temperatures even in Winter are frequently above 32 °F (0 °C), long-lasting snow cover is unusual. The driest month of the year is September, when only 2.95 in (75 mm) of precipitation occurs. In a normal year, precipitation totals 49.68 in (1,262 mm).

Biodiversity

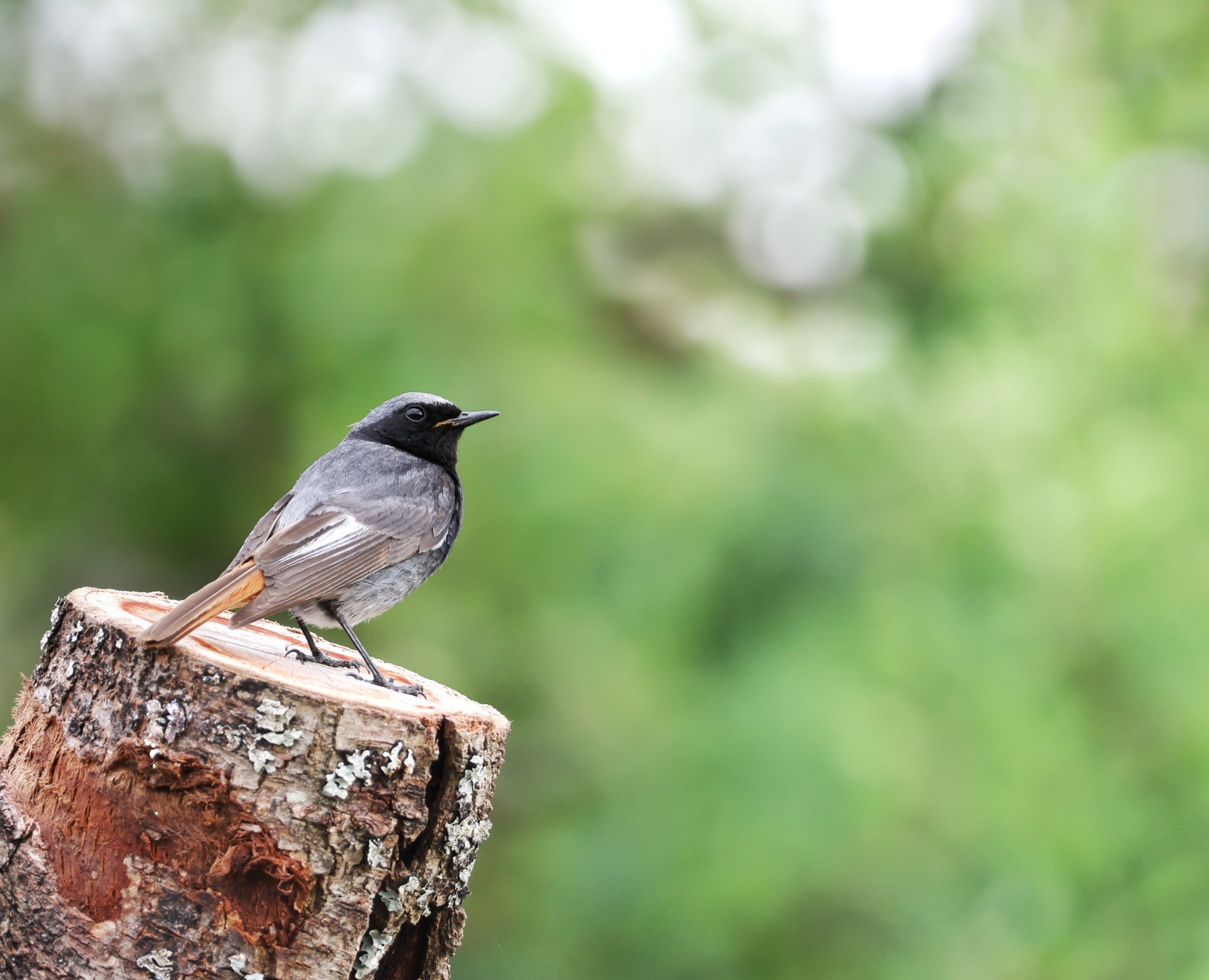
Male Black Redstart perched on a tree stump in Holzgerlingen

Holzgerlingen has many different habitats, though some tend to be small and degraded. Some of the most notable habitats include forest, orchard, grassland, ponds, and arable land.

A 2013 study examined the biodiversity of the Holzgerlingen Municipal Area. A total of 81 bird species were recorded, 70 of which were either confirmed breeding, suspected breeding, or territorial.

A total of four reptile species were recorded, these being the common slow worm, sand lizard, viviparous lizard, and grass snake. Additionally, seven amphibian species were recorded, and 34 butterfly species.

== History ==
The history of the settlement goes back to Neolithic times, and it is thought that the city was founded by Celts sometime in the period between 550 BC and 50 BC. Sometime around 100 AD, the Romans conquered the area around the city, although they were in turn overthrown by Alemannic tribes in the vicinity of 300 AD.

In Germany, because many cities are extremely old and dating is inexact, a city's official history is considered to begin at the first time it is mentioned in writing. Holzgerlingen was first mentioned in the year 1007 in a history written by the Bishop of Bamberg during the reign of Henry II of the Holy Roman Empire. The city was in the possession of the Palatinate of Tübingen from approximately 1100 until 1348, when the city was sold to the state of Württemberg.

The city was deeply affected by the German Peasants' War, a popular revolt which took place in 1525. The Protestant Reformation reached the city in 1534, and the city has remained Lutheran ever since. In 1735, during the War of the Polish Succession, Russian troops were quartered in the city as they marched on France. Just eight years later, in 1743, the city was used to quarter troops for Franz Freiherr von der Trenck during the War of the Austrian Succession.

In 1812 fifteen people from Holzgerlingen joined the troops of Napoleon for his war against Russia so their families would be guaranteed safety, but never returned. The first post office was constructed in 1865, and in 1907, the city was connected to the electric power grid. In 1945, during World War II, French troops burned down the city hall. It was rebuilt in 1950. The city obtained home-rule rights from the German government in 1993.

== Religion ==
The Protestant Reformation reached the city in 1534. In 1635, since then the town has been influenced by Protestantism.

== Number of inhabitants ==
Source: Census results and Statistical office Baden-Württemberg Stuttgart

Year	Inhabitants
1850	1838
1. December 1871	1718
1. December 1890	1924
1. December 1900	1907
1. December 1910	1996
16. June 1925	2192
16. June 1933	2370
17. May 1939	2629
13. September 1950	3640

Year	Inhabitants
6. June 1961	5290
27. May 1970	7173
31. December 1980	8510
27. May 1987	8918
31. December 1990	9847
31. December 1995	11,061
31. December 2000	11,466
31. December 2005	11,906
31. December 2010	12,722
31. December 2015	12,635

== Politics ==
=== Mayors ===
- 1904–1938: Robert Mosthaf
- 1938–1945: Otto Müller
- 1945–1948: Guido Eipperlein
- 1948–1964: Otto Rommel
- 1964–1983: Siegfried Gölz
- 1983–1985: Walter Mack
- 1986–2018: Wilfried Dölker
- 2018–present: Ioannis Delakos

== Sister cities ==
Holzgerlingen's partner cities include Neuenhof, Switzerland, Niesky, in the German federal state of Sachsen, Jílové u Prahy, Czech Republic, and Crystal Lake, Illinois. Crystal Lake South High School and Crystal Lake Central High School participate every other year in a student exchange program with the local high school in Holzgerlingen.

== Economy and infrastructure ==
=== Traffic ===
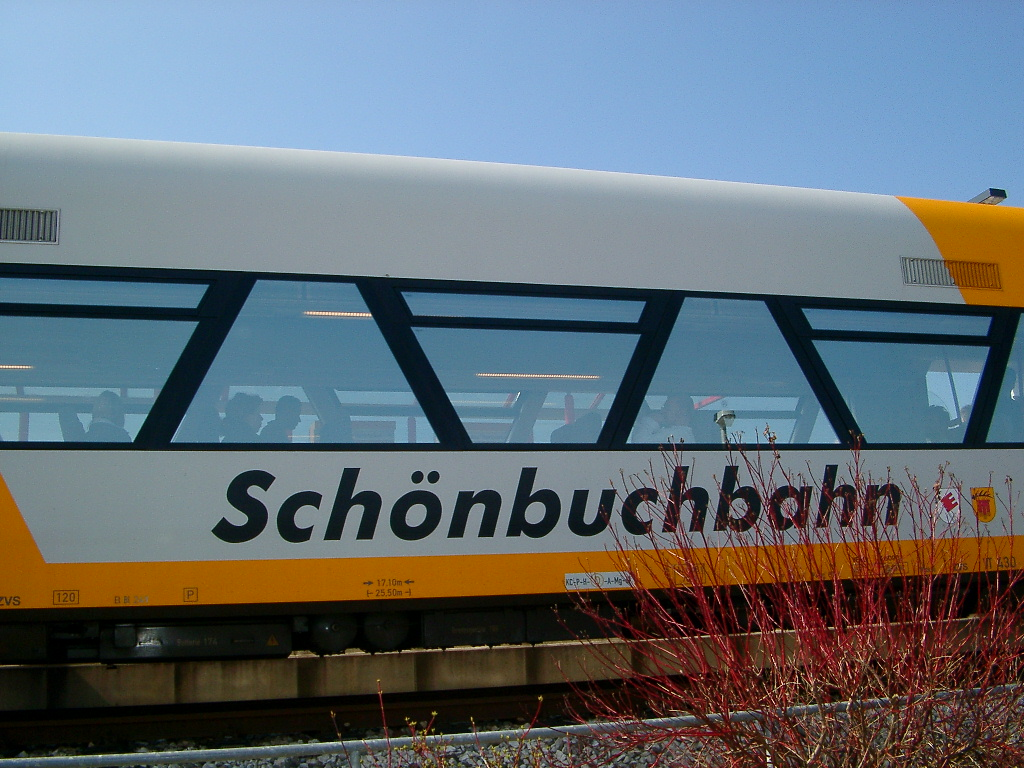
Local Railway, the Schönbuchbahn

In December 1996, the Schönbuchbahn (Schönbuch train line), which runs between Böblingen and the town of Dettenhausen, was brought back to Holzgerlingen after a long period of unused railroad tracks. The train line has three stops in the city. The train is also part of the Verkehrs- und Tarifverbund Stuttgart and is connected to the Stuttgart S-Bahn line S1 at Böblingen. The largest highway in Holzgerlingen is Bundesstraße (Federal Highway) B464, which connects Böblingen and Reutlingen.

=== Civic institutions ===
Holzgerlingen has a 700-seat civic and conference center, which also provides services such as an internet café and a nursing home.

=== Education ===
Holzgerlingen presides over its own modern school system, with elementary through high school provided all within the same city, including seven Kindergartens and a boarding school for the mentally and physically challenged. Also, the city library offers free internet access to residents.

=== Sports ===
In the city of Holzgerlingen, there is a stadium complex with both natural and artificial soccer and American football fields, four sport halls, and a spacious public swimming complex with multiple pools.

Holzgerlingen is the home of the Holzgerlingen Twister, an American football team. The Holzgerlingen Twister met with considerable success in 2008 and 2009, and, having moved up two divisions in two years, began playing in the German Football League in the 2010 season. The Twister tied for second place in the GFL 2 Süd in 2011. The YMCA Holzgerlingen do Handball, Volleyball, Soccer, Dance, Fitness, Aerobic and natural sports in Halls and the Sportgelände Seebrücke YMCA.

== Culture and sightseeing ==
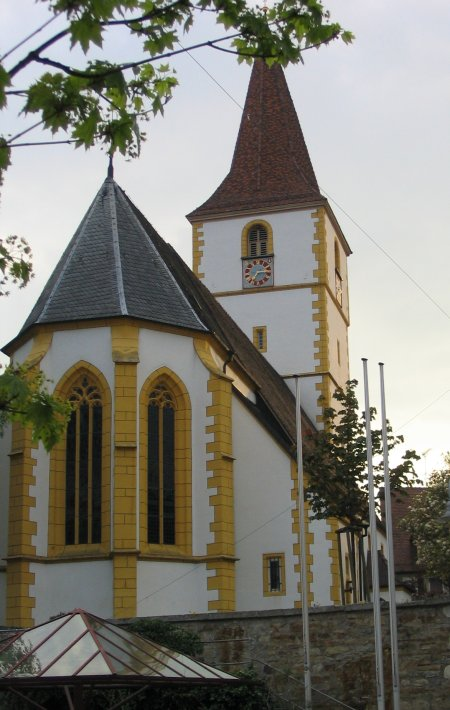
Mauritius Church in Holzgerlingen

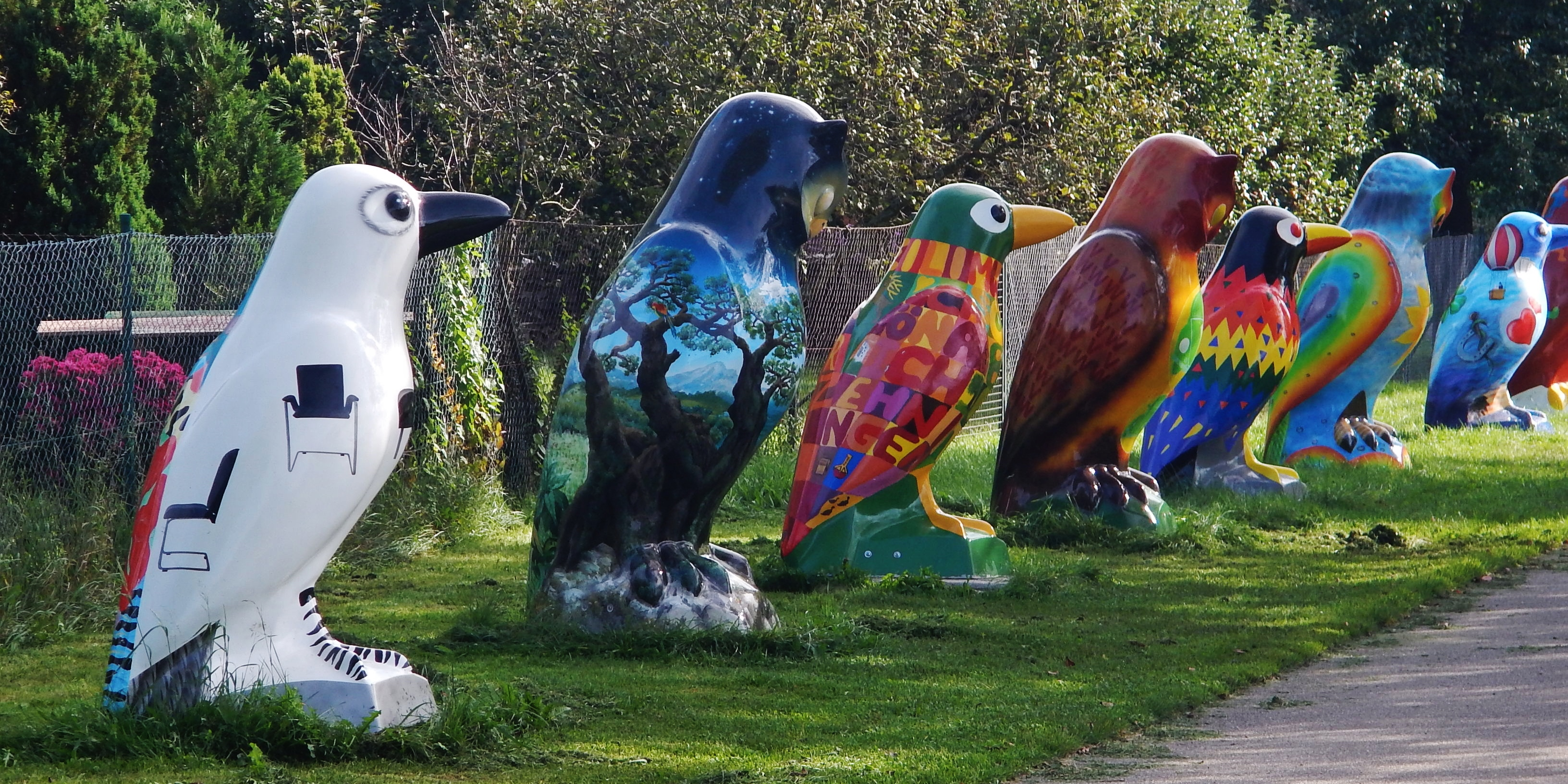
Some of the "StadtArt" statues.

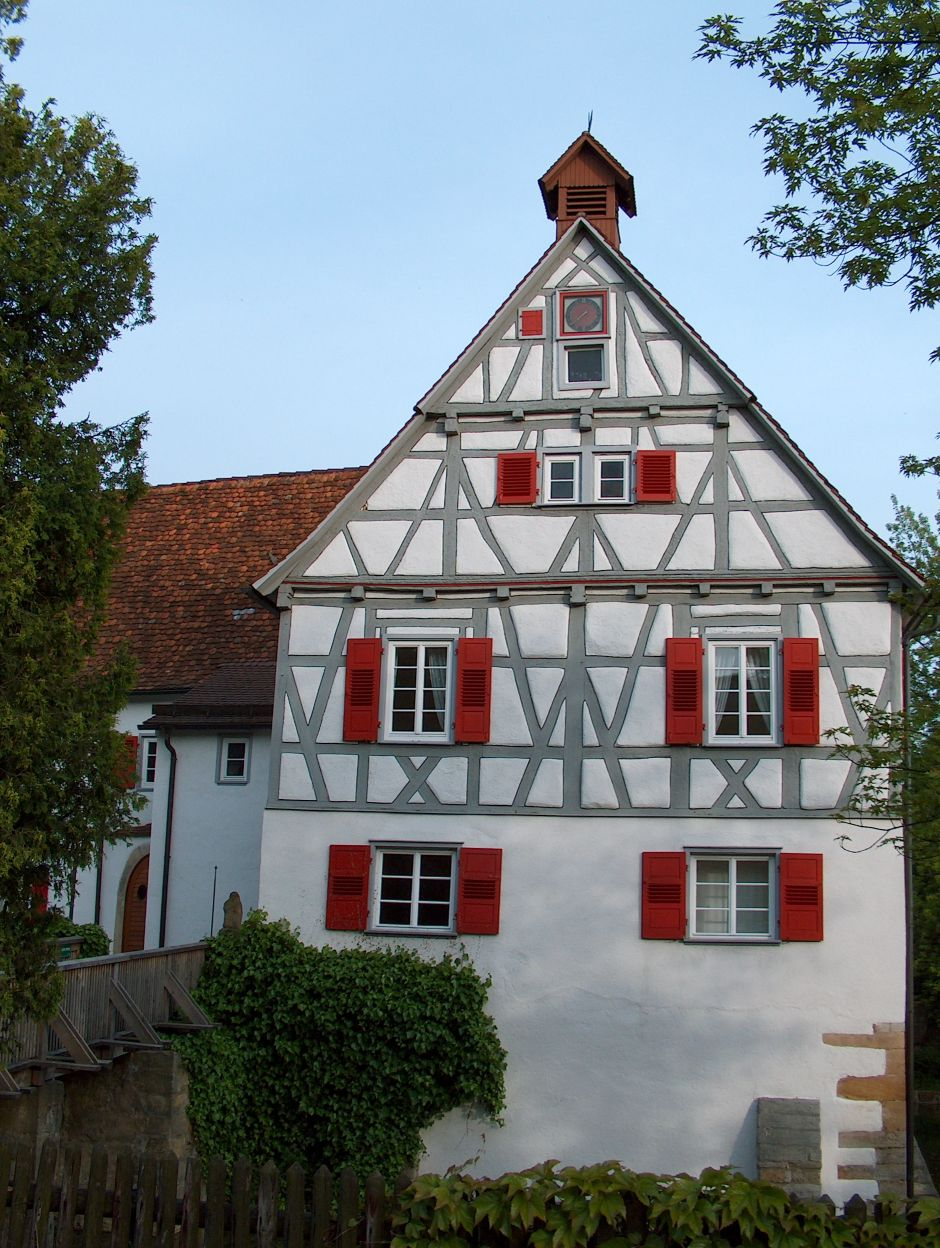
Burg Kalteneck

=== Museums ===
A museum of local history is located in Holzgerlingen.

=== Architecture ===
- The Mauritius Church, which possesses a tower dating from the eleventh century, is currently a legally protected historical landmark.
- Burg Kalteneck ("Castle Kalteneck") is a moated castle first mentioned 1002. Today's castle is built on a foundation dating back in the 14th century. It can be rented for private or public events.

=== Sculptures ===
- Statues of owls and ravens, which are the town's heraldic birds, were first erected in 2007 for the 1000th anniversary of the city during the "StadtArt" campaign. Nearly 90 can now be found throughout Holzgerlingen, each with a different theme.

Nature

In the north of Holzgerlingen there is the Holzgerlinger Wald, a forest with hiking and cycling trails. It is also home to birdlife such as the great spotted woodpecker, black woodpecker, short-toed treecreeper, Eurasian nuthatch, mistle thrush, and crested tit, as well as mammals like foxes and deer.

=== Youth ===
The city possesses a youth center which hosts youth-oriented events, such as midnight sports.

=== Sons and daughters of the city ===
- Gottlob Binder (1885–1961), politician (SPD), President of the State Labor Office of Hesse, State Minister for Reconstruction
- Hans Ulrich Eberle (1927–1988), librarian, director of the City Library of Heilbronn
- Ina Großmann (born 1990), handball player
