= Ulrike Fitzer =

German Air Force pilot (born 1982)

Ulrike Fitzer, née Flender
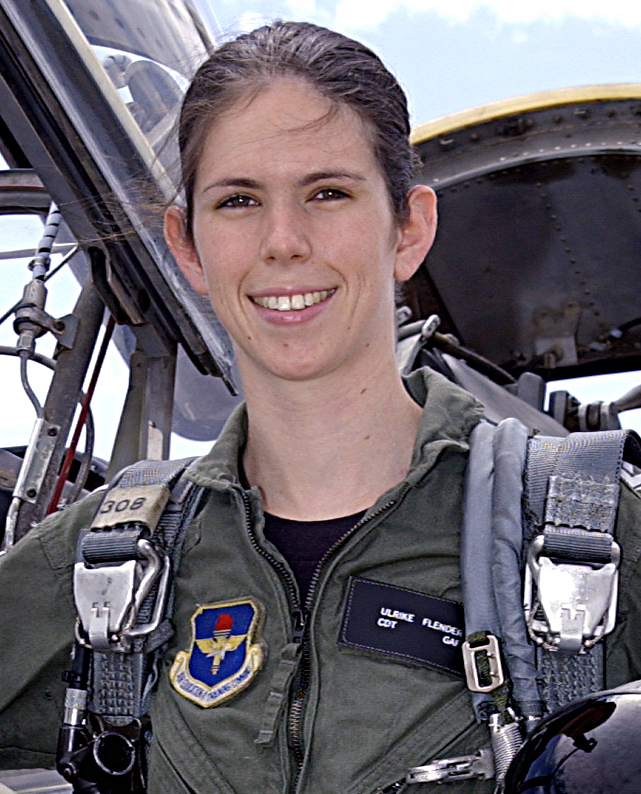
- Fitzer in 2006
- Born: 1982 (age 43–44); Aidlingen, West Germany
- Military career
- Allegiance: Germany
- Service years: 2005– present
- Rank: Major
- Units: JaboG 32 (2008-2013), TaktLwG 73 ″S″ (since 2013)

Ulrike Fitzer (née Flender; born 1982 in Aidlingen) is a German Air Force pilot.

Ulrike Fitzer was the first woman to become a fighter pilot in the German Air Force. She graduated in 2006, from the Euro-NATO Joint Jet Pilot Training Program at Sheppard Air Force Base. Also, she is the first German woman to pilot the Tornado, having completed training in 2007 at Holloman Air Force Base. A TV-documentary (Mission am Limit) on her achievements was produced in 2007.
