= Lerchenberg transmission site =

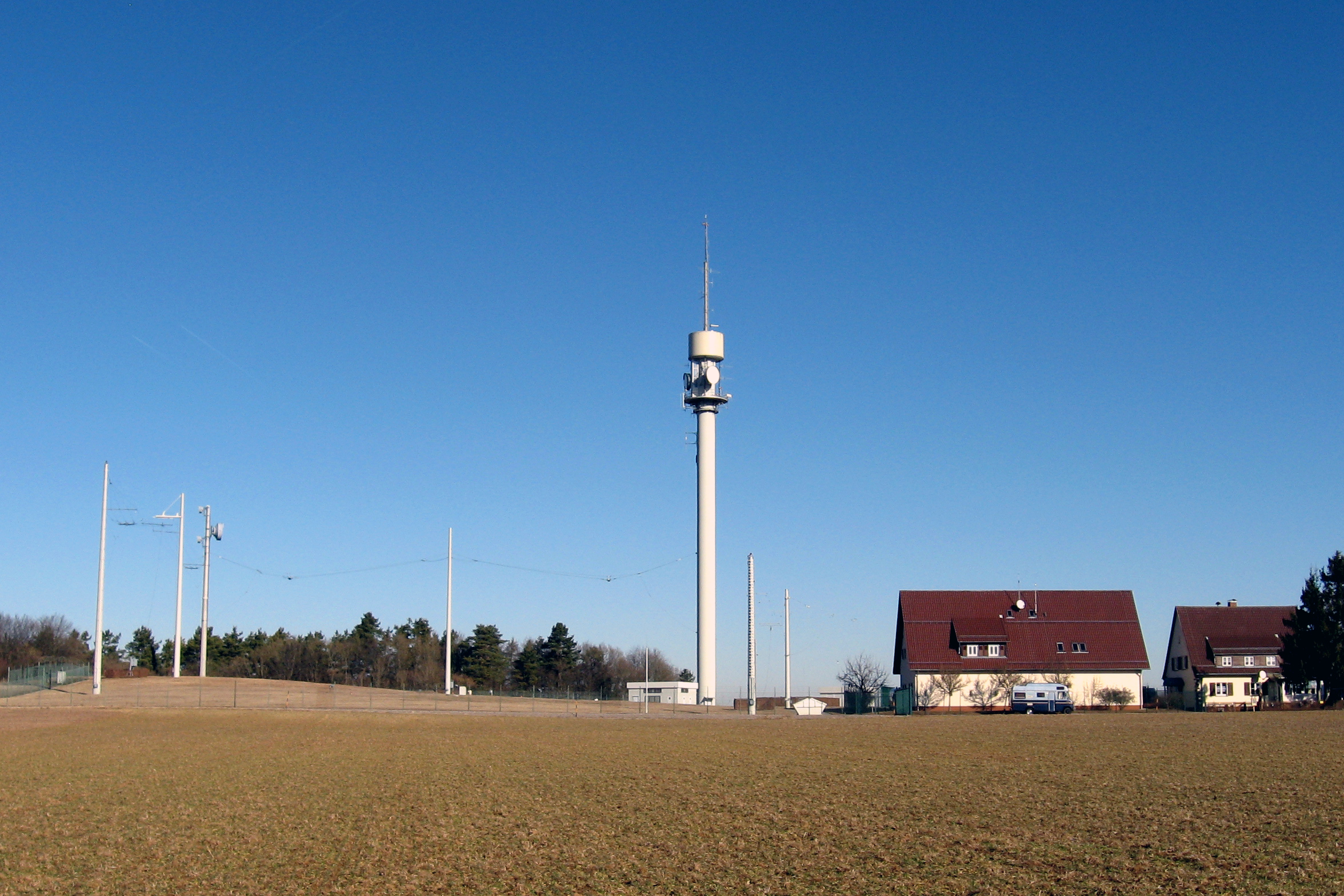
Lerchenberg transmission site

The Lerchenberg transmission site is a site with short wave aerial and an 81-metre-tall (266 ft) telecommunication tower at 48°39′51″N 8°47′42″E on the Lerchenberg near Wildberg, 20 kilometres westwards of Stuttgart, Germany. An access ramp leads to underground premises. The facility is operated by state authorities and was used as a centre for catastrophe management.

== See also ==
- List of towers
