= Ehningen =

- Municipality
- Coat of arms

- Location of Ehningen within Böblingen district
- Interactive map of Ehningen
- Location within Germany Location within Baden-Württemberg
- Coordinates: 48°39′32″N 08°56′25″E
- Country: Germany
- State: Baden-Württemberg
- Admin. region: Stuttgart
- District: Böblingen

Government
  - Mayor (2020–28): Lukas Rosengrün

Area
  - Total: 17.81 km^{2} (6.88 sq mi)
- Elevation: 448 m (1,470 ft)

Population (2025-12-31)
  - Total: 9,275
  - Density: 520.8/km^{2} (1,349/sq mi)
- Time zone: UTC+01:00 (CET)
  - Summer (DST): UTC+02:00 (CEST)
- Postal codes: 71135–71139
- Dialling codes: 07034
- Vehicle registration: BB
- Website: www.ehningen.de

Ehningen (German pronunciation: [ˈeːnɪŋən]) is a municipality in the district of Böblingen in Baden-Württemberg in Germany.

== Geography ==
Ehningen is in Korngäu, on the northwestern edge of Schönbuch nature park. Historically, the city of Ehningen was located north of the Würm, but the Würm now flows through the middle of the modern town. The second major watercourse is the Ehningen Krebsbach, which flows south-west of the old village before merging into the Würm.

== Districts ==
Ehningen includes the village of Ehningen, the hamlet of Mauren, and the house and the mill towns of Hoingen, Rainmulin, Sulz and Haldenölmühle.

=== Mauren ===
Mauren's Schlossgut, or estate, is located on the border between the Upper Gäu and the Schönbuch in the Würm river valley. In all probability, the name Mauren (Mason) originated from the word wall (Mauer). This refers to a former Roman estate which lies near present-day Mauren in Würmtal.

Mauren was first mentioned in 1320, and was then a fief of Württemberg. It was incorporated into Ehningen in 1851. Over the centuries, Mauren changed hands frequently. The Mauren castle was built in 1617 by Heinrich Schickard. In 1943 it was bombed by a British air raid, when due to fog, it was confused with nearby Boeblingen. The outer walls of the ground floor are still standing, and the vaulted cellar under the ground floor also remains. In 2005, two houses were built on steel pillars directly above the outer walls of the ruins.

== History ==
The first documented mention of Ehningen can be dated to 1185, when the knight Albertus de Ondingin purchased a manor in Herrenberg. Albertus de Ondingin was a member of the local nobility, and in all likelihood was a vassal of the Count Calw.

There is ample evidence of the continued use of this countryside in prehistoric times, however. For example, a Neolithic arrowhead (3000-1800 BC) and a Bronze Age grave mound (1800-1200 BC) were discovered locally. A Celtic four-sided earthwork was once located just south of present-day Ehningen, although it has been overbuilt.

Beginning in the third century AD, the area was colonized by the Alemanni. Evidence of this colonization was discovered in 1878 during the construction of the Stuttgart–Horb railway, when several Alemannic graves were found. The suffix -ingen means that Ehningen can be classified as one of the original Swabian villages; the original name Ondgingin or -onding indicates the town may be named for an Alemannic tribe leader named "Ondo".

In medieval times the size of Ehningen remained relatively constant, and the settlement was limited by the so-called "Etters". The Etters were essentially fences that would prevent the cattle from getting out into the gardens of the houses. The settlement boundary defined by the Etters was not changed until the 19th century.

There were three streets in the Old City: The Upper Street (now King Street), Böblingen (which ran east to west from the Upper Gate to Herrenberg), and Aidlingen Gärtringen (which led through the Lower Gate). The Dagersheim road ran north through the Weilemer Gate (also Linsentor). None of these three gates, none have survived.

In 1850 Ehningen had three Catholic and 1634 Protestant inhabitants, who lived and worked in 308 primary and 88 outbuildings. Until World War II Ehningen had about 2,000 inhabitants, a figure that steadily increased to just over 7,000 by 2000.

== Religion ==
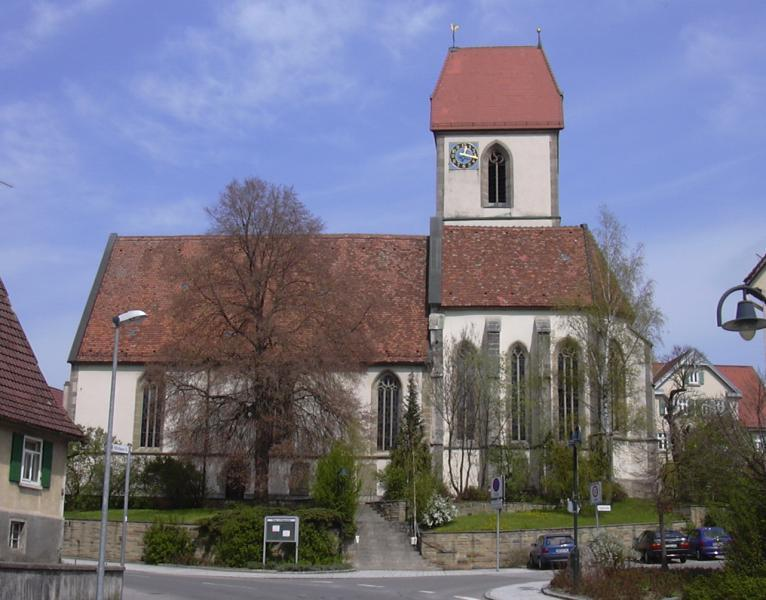
The Protestant Marienkirche in Ehningen

Since the Reformation, Ehningen's residents have been overwhelmingly Evangelical Lutheran. It was only after the end of World War II when a Catholic parish was established in the wake of the resettlement of displaced persons.

The Protestant Marienkirche (St. Mary's Church) dates from the 15th and 16th centuries and is built in the Gothic style. It is likely built on the same site as an earlier church in Ehningen.

The current Catholic church, St Elizabeth, was completed in 1957.

Mauren's The Church of Our Lady has long been a popular pilgrimage site. Since 1554, the hamlet of Mauren had their own parish. This was until 1809. Today, only the chorus is used as a chapel (at irregular intervals). The nave is used as a storeroom.

The New Apostolic Church is located on the way to Altdorf.

== Demographics ==
Year	Population
1550	500
1610	800
1650	300
1850	1,637
1939	1,985
1950	3,068
1970	5,890
1987	6,906
2008	8,012

== Politics ==
=== Council ===
After the last local elections on 25 May 2014 the council has 18 members. The turnout was 55.9%. The election gave the following results:

- Allgemeine Bürgerschaft Ehningen ABE 7 seats
- CDU 5 seats
- Alliance 90/The Greens and Aufwind 3 seats
- SPD 2 seats

The chairman of the municipal council is the mayor.

=== Mayor ===
- 1948–1960: Wilhelm Schäfer
- 1960–1980: Rolf Mezger
- 1980–2004: Hans Heinzmann
- 2004-2020: Claus Unger
- since 2020: Lukas Rosengrün

== Crest ==

The town's crest is a golden duck's foot clutching a red apple on a field of blue.

== Economy and infrastructure ==
Ehningen is a typical village in the catchment area of Boeblingen, Sindelfingen and Stuttgart, with a very high percentage of commuters. There are three industrial parks in Ehningen: Letts, Birkensee, Bernrain. A major employer located on the outskirts of Ehningen is IBM which relocated its German Headquarters to Ehningen in 2009 from Stuttgart. Bertrand AG is also a significant employer. Other establishments in the village include commerce, trade, catering and agriculture.

=== Transportation ===
Ehningen is located on Bundesautobahn 81. The "Bodensee motorway" runs from Würzburg to Gottmadingen and was built in the late 1970s.

The Stuttgart–Horb railway was built in 1878 and connects Ehningen with the national rail network.

Rail line S1 (Plochingen-Stuttgart-Herrenberg) on the Stuttgart S-Bahn commuter trains have run on this route since 1991. The train usually runs every half-hour in both directions.

=== Educational institutions ===
There are four school buildings in Ehningen, of which only the Friedrich Kammerer primary and secondary school (1968) are still being used as a school. It lends its name from the inventor of the first friction match, Jacob Frederick Kammerer, who was a native to the town. Since 2002, a school social worker has been available to students, parents and teachers. The school social worker at the Friedrich Kammerer school provides individual assistance and counseling, social education group work and projects, community work and networking as well as open leisure facilities. It is part of the Young People's Commune Ehningen.

The "Fronäckerschule" was dedicated in 1915. Its name is derived from its location on the Fronäckern, which were located outside the old village. It now houses the adult education center and other facilities. The former new school (built 1843) and the former old school (built 1826) are centrally located next to the Lutheran Church (St. Mary). Both were renovated in the 1980s and now serve as residences.

== Culture and attractions ==
=== Regular events ===
The Pentecostal Ehninger market is known far beyond the borders Ehningen. It takes place every year on Whit Monday and is visited by up to 20,000 people. It is part of the Ehninger Pentecost festival, which takes place from Saturday until Whit Monday on the festival grounds below the Fronäckerschule and is organized alternately by the local musical association and the sports club. The historic Spring Fair was officially sanctioned in 1837.

== Notable residents ==
- Jacob Friedrich Kammerer (24 May 1796 – 23 October 1857 in Ludwigsburg), an inventor of the phosphorus friction match
