= Deckenpfronn =

- Municipality
- Coat of arms

- Location of Deckenpfronn within Böblingen district
- Interactive map of Deckenpfronn
- Location within Germany Location within Baden-Württemberg
- Coordinates: 48°39′05″N 08°49′22″E
- Country: Germany
- State: Baden-Württemberg
- Admin. region: Stuttgart
- District: Böblingen

Government
  - Mayor (2017–25): Daniel Gött

Area
  - Total: 11.41 km^{2} (4.41 sq mi)
- Elevation: 569 m (1,867 ft)

Population (2025-12-31)
  - Total: 3,241
  - Density: 284.0/km^{2} (735.7/sq mi)
- Time zone: UTC+01:00 (CET)
  - Summer (DST): UTC+02:00 (CEST)
- Postal codes: 75392
- Dialling codes: 07056
- Vehicle registration: BB
- Website: www.deckenpfronn.de

Deckenpfronn (German pronunciation: [dɛkn̩ˈp͡fʁɔn]) is a municipality in the district of Böblingen in Baden-Württemberg in Germany.

North of Deckenpfronn on the Lerchenberg is a radio transmitter site of the police, which includes an 81-metre-high transmission tower.

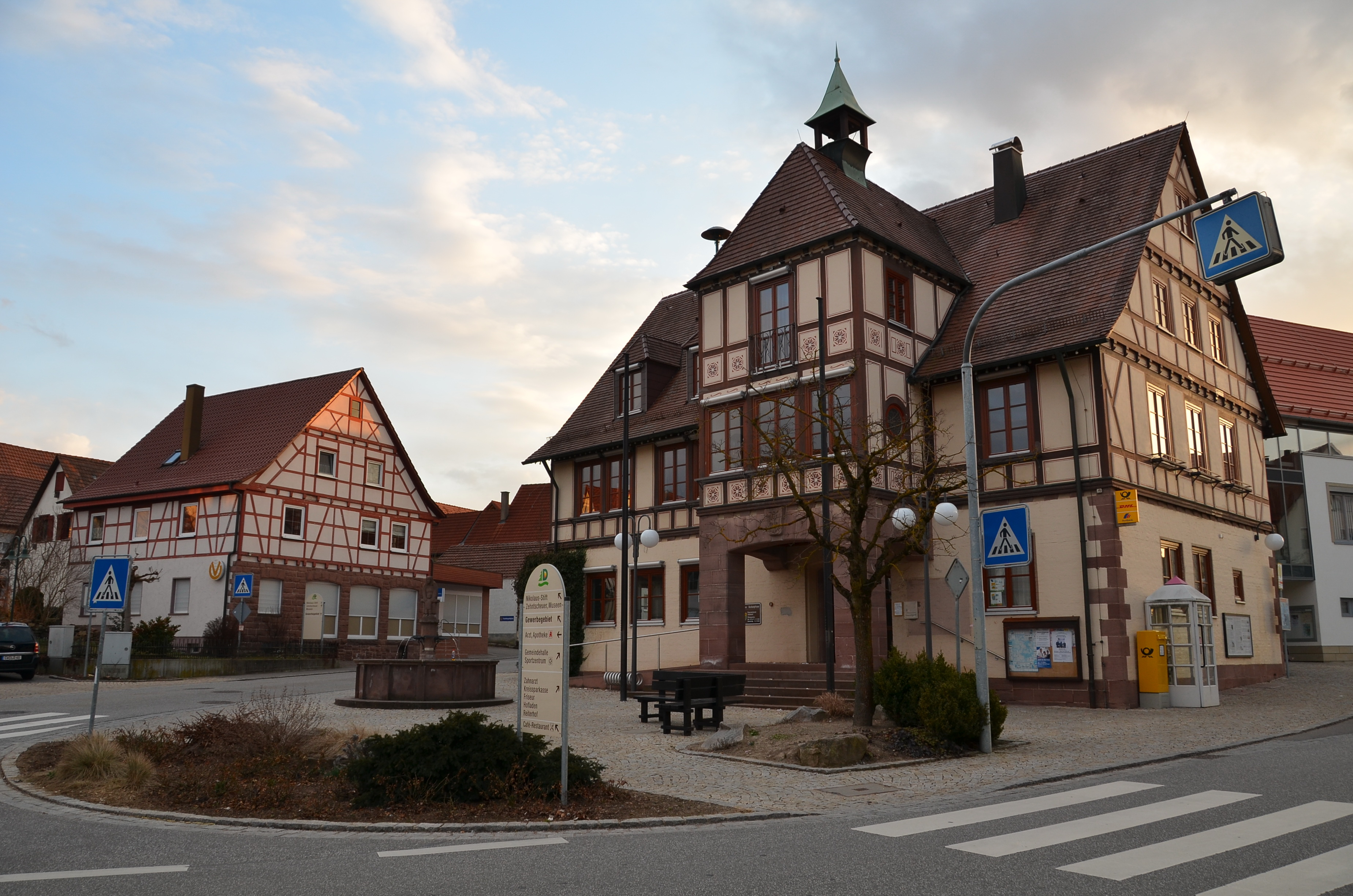
Deckenpfronn

== Population ==
- 1900: 1.178
- 1950: 1.003
- 1987: 2.074
- 2005: 2.929
- 2010: 3.168
- 2015: 3.306
