= Mötzingen =

- Municipality
- Coat of arms

- Location of Mötzingen within Böblingen district
- Interactive map of Mötzingen
- Location within Germany Location within Baden-Württemberg
- Coordinates: 48°31′59″N 08°46′28″E
- Country: Germany
- State: Baden-Württemberg
- Admin. region: Stuttgart
- District: Böblingen

Government
  - Mayor (2024–32): Benjamin Finis

Area
  - Total: 8.15 km^{2} (3.15 sq mi)
- Elevation: 533 m (1,749 ft)

Population (2025-12-31)
  - Total: 3,734
  - Density: 458/km^{2} (1,190/sq mi)
- Time zone: UTC+01:00 (CET)
  - Summer (DST): UTC+02:00 (CEST)
- Postal codes: 71159
- Dialling codes: 07452
- Vehicle registration: BB
- Website: www.moetzingen.de

Mötzingen (German pronunciation: [ˈmœt͡sɪŋən]) is a municipality in the district of Böblingen in Baden-Württemberg in Germany.

== History ==
Mötzingen was first mentioned in written records in 1094. The earliest artifacts discovered in Mötzingen can be traced back to the Iron Age, approximately 900 BC. The region subsequently came under Roman control around 2000 years ago, integrating Mötzingen into the broader administrative framework of the Zehntland, which encompassed a significant portion of southern Germany. Roman hegemony lasted until the incursion of the Alemanni around 250 AD. However, this period of Alemannic dominance was relatively short-lived; by 496 AD, the Alemanni were decisively defeated and incorporated into the Frankish realm under King Clovis.

On December 25, 496, King Clovis underwent conversion to Christianity, despite exhibiting conduct that starkly contradicted Christian teachings. This pivotal moment catalyzed the establishment of Christianity as the state religion across the Frankish territories, marking a significant shift in the sociopolitical landscape. By the conclusion of the 8th century, the process of Christianization in the region was largely completed, resulting in a profound transformation of cultural and religious practices. Following this period, there was a notable increase in the donation of both villages and fortifications to various monastic institutions, reflecting the intertwined nature of land ownership, ecclesiastical authority, and the burgeoning power of the Church.

On June 6, 1580, the Bishopric of Speyer completed the acquisition of the castle and village of Mötzingen. Just a few months later, on February 13, 1581, the Bishop sold these properties back to Duke Ludwig von Württemberg for the original price of 12,000 gulden. Following the Reformation, which was widely implemented in Württemberg's towns in 1534, Mötzingen became part of the jurisdiction of the deanery of Herrenberg.

During the Thirty Years' War, the population of Mötzingen experienced a significant decline, with estimates indicating over 200 inhabitants in 1601, dropping to approximately 60 by 1641. The famine year of 1816, characterized by an inadequate and belated grain harvest, prompted a substantial emigration wave, resulting in 460 residents relocating to America. Mötzingen transitioned from the district of Nagold to the district of Herrenberg prior to 1810, and it has been incorporated into the Böblingen district since 1938.

The current church structure dates back to 1793, while the old town hall was constructed between 1745 and 1746, originally serving dual functions as both a school and administrative center. Following a renovation in the 1990s, the town hall has been partially repurposed for residential use. These two edifices remain architectural landmarks within the village. The establishment of formal education in Mötzingen did not occur until the late 16th century. The first dedicated schoolhouse was erected in 1875 but was tragically destroyed by fire on September 17, 1907. During the interim before the construction of a new facility, educational activities were conducted within the town hall and the early childhood school. In 1909, a new schoolhouse was built on the original site, which is now referred to as the “old schoolhouse.”

== Geography ==
Mötzingen is located on the western edge of the Oberes Gäus, serving as a gateway to the foothills of the northern Black Forest. This flat hilly landscape in the southern Böblingen district is notably fertile. Historically, agriculture and livestock farming have been key economic drivers in the region, as seen in the relatively large farms equipped with extensive stabling and barn facilities— a clear sign of a thriving agrarian economy. Moreover, fruit cultivation has risen to prominence as an important agricultural industry, while trade and artisanal crafts have played a more limited role in comparison.

== Demographics ==
Population development:

| Year | Inhabitants |
|---|---|
| 1990 | 2,979 |
| 2001 | 3,546 |
| 2011 | 3,610 |
| 2021 | 3,674 |

== Mayor ==
- 1994–2008: Thomas Sprißler (born 1966)
- 2008–2024: Marcel Hagenlocher
- since 2024: Benjamin Finis
