= Weissach =

- Municipality
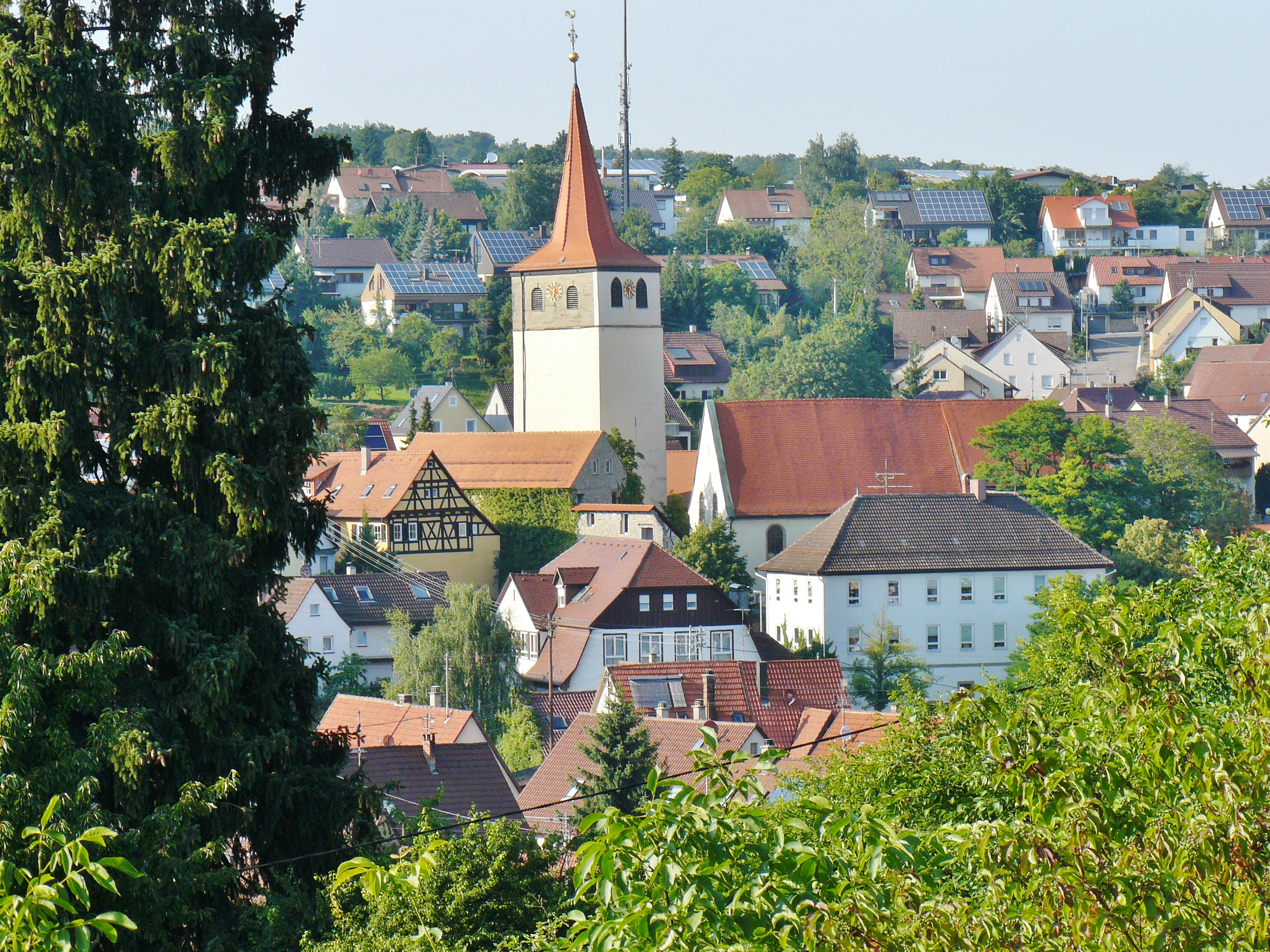
- Weissach

- Coat of arms

- Location of Weissach within Böblingen district
- Interactive map of Weissach
- Location within Germany Location within Baden-Württemberg
- Coordinates: 48°50′53″N 8°55′13″E
- Country: Germany
- State: Baden-Württemberg
- Admin. region: Stuttgart
- District: Böblingen
- Subdivisions: 2

Government
  - Mayor (2022–30): Jens Millow

Area
  - Total: 22.19 km^{2} (8.57 sq mi)
- Elevation: 375 m (1,230 ft)

Population (2025-12-31)
  - Total: 7,749
  - Density: 349.2/km^{2} (904.5/sq mi)
- Time zone: UTC+01:00 (CET)
  - Summer (DST): UTC+02:00 (CEST)
- Postal codes: 71287
- Dialling codes: 07044
- Vehicle registration: BB
- Website: www.weissach.de

Weissach (German pronunciation: [ˈvaɪsax]) is a municipality in the district of Böblingen in Baden-Württemberg in Germany.

Erich Hartmann (April 19, 1922, in Weissach – September 20, 1993, in Weil im Schönbuch) was a Luftwaffe pilot in World War 2. With 352 confirmed kills, he was the most successful fighter pilot in the history of air combat.

== Porsche R&D Facility ==
Groundbreaking for the research and development (R&D) center took place on 16 October 1961. The center, known as "Entwicklungszentrum Weissach" or "Development Center Weissach" opened on 1 October 1971. Porsche relocated its entire R&D department from nearby Zuffenhausen, and the design department followed in 1972. Eventually Porsche Motorsports racing department and they construct concept cars there now as well.

By the mid-1980s, a measuring center for environmental technology and a test building for engines and power units were built, among other new facilities. In May 1986, Porsche opened what was then the most modern wind tunnel in the world.

Porsche named the Weissach axle after the town.

The Porsche 918 Spyder supercar was developed in Weissach and to its honor Porsche offered an optional US$84,000 "Weissach package" that featured reduced weight and improved aerodynamics.

As of 2025 Porsche offers the Weissach Package on the 2025 Porsche 911 GT3 RS and the Porsche Taycan Turbo GT.

== Mayors ==
- 1948–1972: Herrmann Kempf
- 1973–1997: Wolfgang Lucas
- 1997–2005: Roland Portmann
- 2005–2006: Reinhard Riesch
- 2006–2014: Ursula Kreutel
- 2014–2022: Daniel Töpfer
- Since 2022: Jens Millow
