= Hildrizhausen =

- Municipality
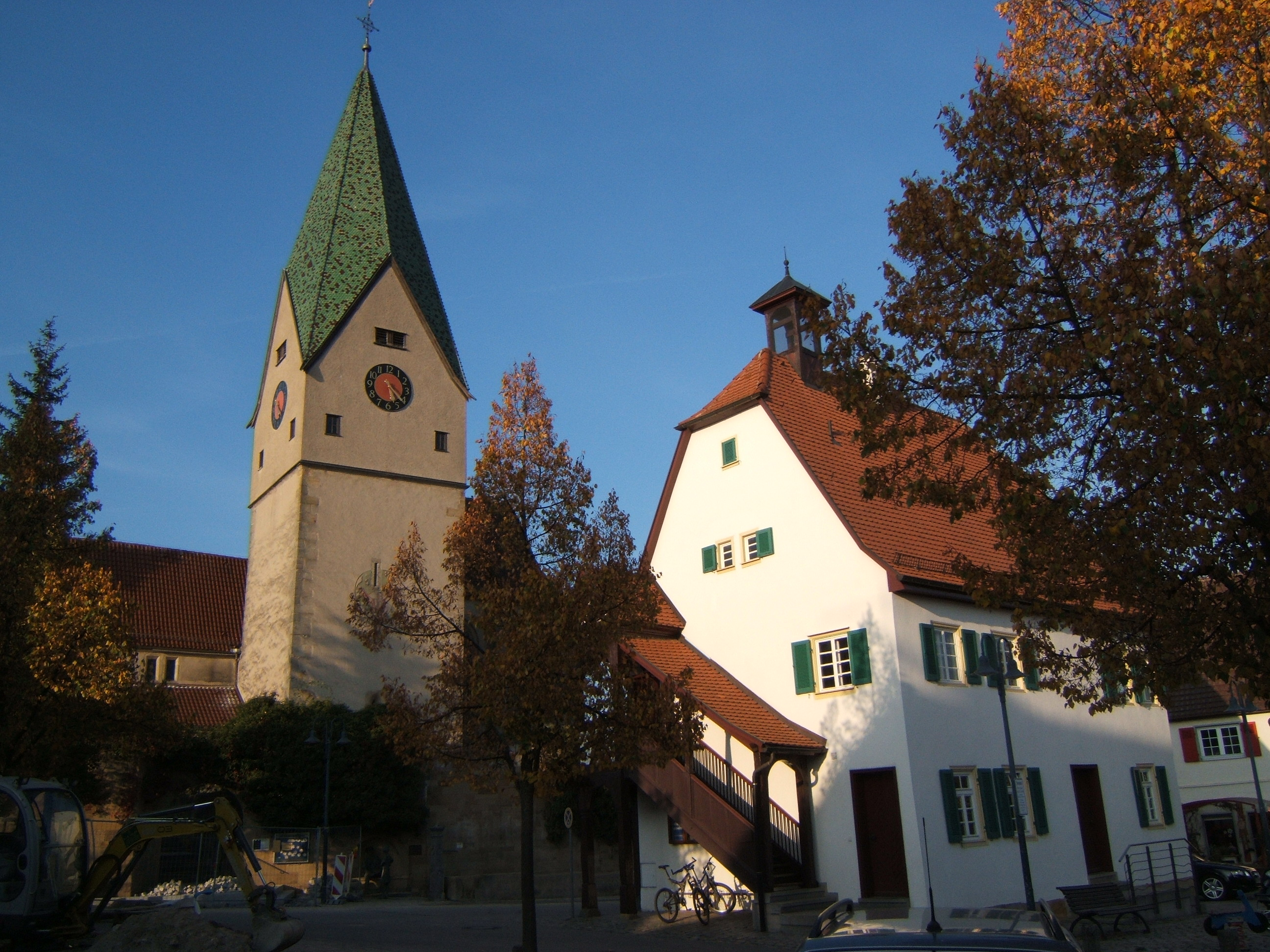

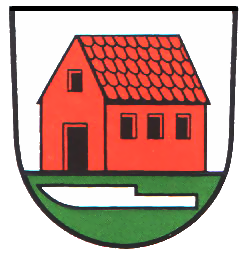
- Coat of arms

- Location of Hildrizhausen within Böblingen district
- Interactive map of Hildrizhausen
- Location within Germany Location within Baden-Württemberg
- Coordinates: 48°37′30″N 08°58′12″E
- Country: Germany
- State: Baden-Württemberg
- Admin. region: Stuttgart
- District: Böblingen

Government
  - Mayor (2018–26): Matthias Schöck

Area
  - Total: 12.17 km^{2} (4.70 sq mi)
- Elevation: 481 m (1,578 ft)

Population (2025-12-31)
  - Total: 3,659
  - Density: 300.7/km^{2} (778.7/sq mi)
- Time zone: UTC+01:00 (CET)
  - Summer (DST): UTC+02:00 (CEST)
- Postal codes: 71157
- Dialling codes: 07034
- Vehicle registration: BB
- Website: www.hildrizhausen.de

Hildrizhausen (German pronunciation: [hɪldʁɪt͡sˈhaʊ̯zn̩]) is a municipality in the district of Böblingen in Baden-Württemberg in Germany.

== Geography ==
Hildrizhausen, with its 3,615 inhabitants, (Note: As of: 31 March 2018.) is located on a clearing of the Schönbuch and about 9 kilometres south of Böblingen. In Hildrizhausen there is one of the two sources of the river Würm.

== History ==
Hildrizhausen was most likely founded in the 8th century.

== Literature ==
Hildrizhausen features in a novel "The Schoenbuch Forest" by Robert John Goddard published in paperback by Bright Pen (2006) and available as an e-book. (ISBN 075521045X)
