= Aidlingen =

German municipality

- Municipality
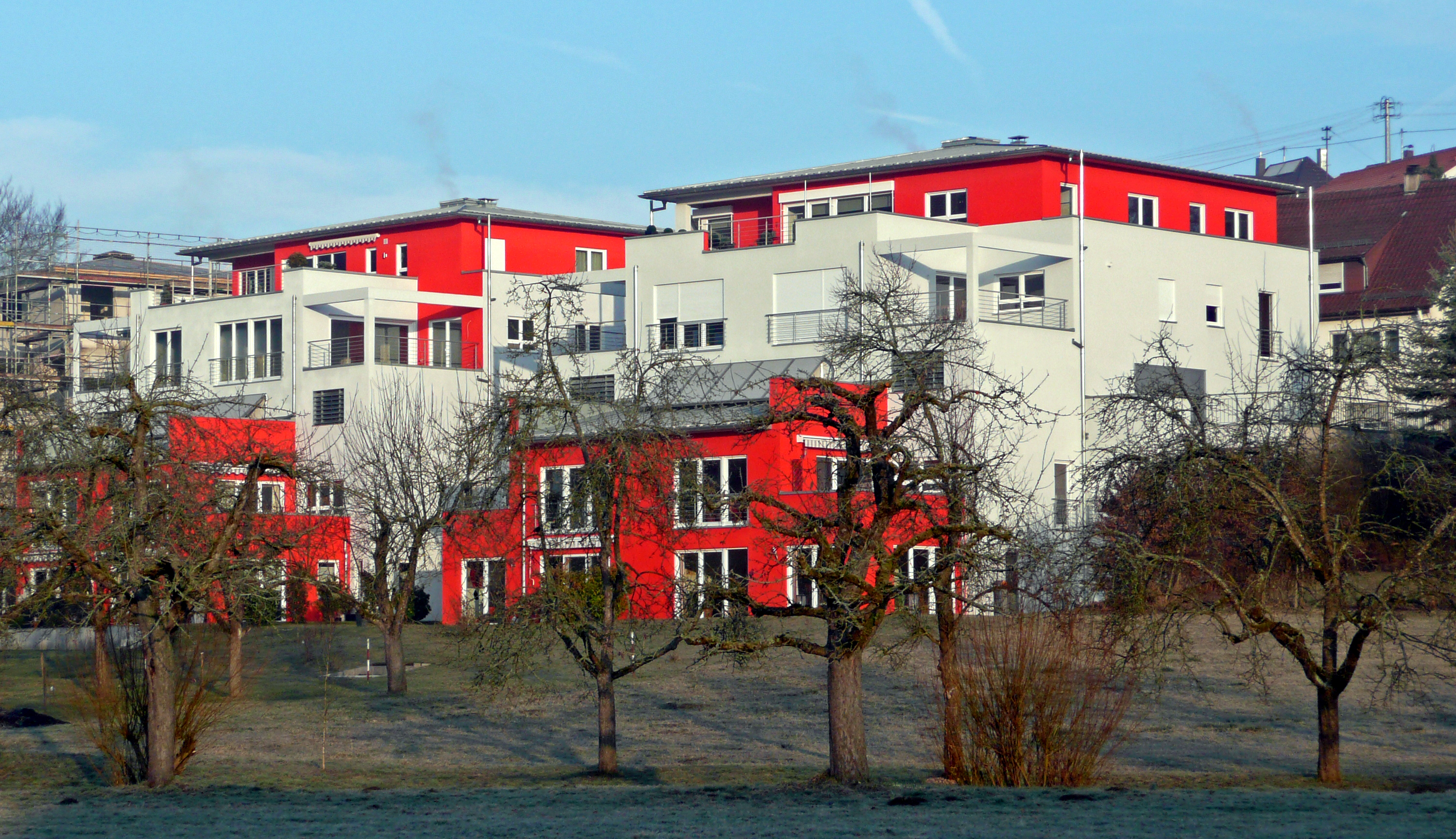
- The Aidterrassen

- Coat of arms

- Location of Aidlingen within Böblingen district
- Interactive map of Aidlingen
- Location within Germany Location within Baden-Württemberg
- Coordinates: 48°40′45″N 8°53′49″E
- Country: Germany
- State: Baden-Württemberg
- Admin. region: Stuttgart
- District: Böblingen

Area
  - Total: 26.56 km^{2} (10.25 sq mi)
- Elevation: 427 m (1,401 ft)

Population (2025-12-31)
  - Total: 9,313
  - Density: 350.6/km^{2} (908.2/sq mi)
- Time zone: UTC+01:00 (CET)
  - Summer (DST): UTC+02:00 (CEST)
- Postal codes: 71134
- Dialling codes: 07034 07056
- Vehicle registration: BB
- Website: www.aidlingen.de

Aidlingen (German pronunciation: [ˈaɪ̯dlɪŋən]) is a municipality in the district of Böblingen in Baden-Württemberg in Germany.

== History ==
The County of Württemberg came into possession of Aidlingen when it was sold to Württemberg by the Lords of Bondorf in 1365. Aidlingen was ruled from the city of Böblingen while nearby Dachtal was given to the jurisdiction of Calw. Aidlingen expanded substantially and industrialized after World War II, particularly in the 1960s and 1970s. Dachtal was incorporated into Aidlingen in 1971 and nearly doubled in size through the 1980s.

== Geography ==
The municipality (Gemeinde) of Aidlingen is found in the district of Böblingen, in the German state of Baden-Württemberg. Aidlingen lies on the western edge of Böblingen district, along its border with Calw's district, and physically in the Heckengäu and the Upper Gäu regions. The main watercourse in the municipal area is the Würm, which flows north-to-west through the eastern portion of the municipality. The lowest elevation above sea level in the municipal area, 403 meters (1,322 ft) Normalnull (NN), is found along the Würm. The highest, 576 meters (1,890 ft) NN, is near Dachtal.

Besides Aidlingen itself, the municipality contains Ortsteile (districts) Deufringen, Dachtel, and Lehenweiler.

== Politics ==
Aidlingen has three boroughs (Ortsteile): Aidlingen, Dachtal, and Deufringen.

Ekkehard Fauth has been the mayor of Aidlingen since 2000.

=== Coat of arms ===
Aidlingen's coat of arms displays a blue and yellow globus cruciger upon a field of white. The globus cruciger has been a motif associated with Aidlingen since 1609 and it was used in the seal of the local Schultheiß from the 19th century to 1923. On 20 December 1929, at the insistence of the Böblingen district office, Aidlingen's municipal council adopted a coat of arms that pictured a globus cruciger in a white above one of blue with a rake and scythe, crossed and in white. These agricultural implements were removed from the coat of arms in 1971. The revised pattern was approved by the Federal Ministry of the Interior on 12 January 1973 and municipal flag was issued by the same body to accompany the new coat of arms.

== Transportation ==
Aidlingen is connected to Germany's network of roadways by Bundesautobahn 81. Local public transportation is provided by the Verkehrs- und Tarifverbund Stuttgart.
