= Schönaich =

- Municipality
- Coat of arms

- Location of Schönaich within Böblingen district
- Interactive map of Schönaich
- Location within Germany Location within Baden-Württemberg
- Coordinates: 48°39′25″N 09°03′46″E
- Country: Germany
- State: Baden-Württemberg
- Admin. region: Stuttgart
- District: Böblingen

Government
  - Mayor (2021–29): Anna Walther

Area
  - Total: 14.15 km^{2} (5.46 sq mi)
- Elevation: 435 m (1,427 ft)

Population (2025-12-31)
  - Total: 10,483
  - Density: 740.8/km^{2} (1,919/sq mi)
- Time zone: UTC+01:00 (CET)
  - Summer (DST): UTC+02:00 (CEST)
- Postal codes: 71101
- Dialling codes: 07031
- Vehicle registration: BB
- Website: www.schoenaich.de

Schönaich (German pronunciation: [ˈʃøːnaɪç]) is a municipality in the district of Böblingen, Baden-Württemberg, Germany. It is situated 5 km southeast of Böblingen, and 16 km southwest of Stuttgart.

Schönaich is a township with a population of about 10,000 and is situated at the outskirts of the Schönbuch forest in a scenic location but at the same time close to cities like Böblingen, Sindelfingen, Tübingen, and Stuttgart. A major shopping mall is nearby in Sindelfingen. A number of restaurants or snack bars with German, Italian, Turkish and Chinese food and ice cream parlors offer their services in Schönaich. The Panzerkaserne, an American installation with a commissary, is 3 km away from Schönaich.

Schönaich has six Kindergarten for children between 3 and 6 years of age and a place for toddlers called "Kinderhaus". First grade to fourth grade students attend the local school. From 5th grade on students can either go to one of the high schools (Gymnasium) in Böblingen or continue at the middle school in Schönaich. The graduation from a Gymnasium or an equivalent degree from a foreign school permits access to the universities and colleges in Germany. Universities are in Stuttgart and Tübingen.

Schönaich has a music school (Jugendmusikschule), an arts school, and an adult education school (Volkshochschule) which offers various courses mainly for adults, but also some for the youth and children.

Doctors from several specialties practise in Schönaich, including general practitioners, internists, orthopaedists, gynaecologists, paediatricians, dentists, and ear, nose, and throat specialists. The nearest hospitals are in Böblingen and Sindelfingen.

Public transport connects Schönaich with Böblingen, although services are less frequent at night. Stuttgart Airport (IATA: STR) is approximately a 20-minute drive from Schönaich. The municipality also has access to the A81 motorway, which provides connections towards Stuttgart, Lake Constance, and Switzerland, as well as routes to Munich and Karlsruhe. The ADAC The German automobile Club gives travel advice. The Black Forest, the Schwäbische Alb with its caves, or Lake Constanz are close enough for a one-day excursion. Tübingen and Bebenhausen are historical places you will enjoy to discover. There are many opportunities for leisure.

The TV standard is PAL. Internet access via DSL is possible in all of Schönaich.

The local police station is staffed during the day.

You find churches from the following denominations in Schönaich: Evangelische Kirchengemeinde (Protestant church), Katholische Kirchengemeinde (Roman Catholic church), Süddeutsche Gemeinschaft Schönaich (a free church close to the Protestant church), Evangelisch-Methodistische Gemeinde (Methodist church), and Neuapostolische Kirche (New Apostolic Church). Services are usually in German.

In the industrial area on the outskirts of Schönaich is the small industry typical for the area. The exception and major employers in the area are Hewlett-Packard and IBM in Böblingen, and Mercedes AG in Sindelfingen, all within easy commuting distance.
