= Nufringen =

- Town
- Coat of arms

- Location of Nufringen within Böblingen district
- Interactive map of Nufringen
- Location within Germany Location within Baden-Württemberg
- Coordinates: 48°37′20″N 08°53′15″E
- Country: Germany
- State: Baden-Württemberg
- Admin. region: Stuttgart
- District: Böblingen
- Founded: 12th century

Government
  - Mayor (2017–25): Ingolf Welte

Area
  - Total: 10.04 km^{2} (3.88 sq mi)
- Elevation: 459 m (1,506 ft)

Population (2025-12-31)
  - Total: 5,804
  - Density: 578.1/km^{2} (1,497/sq mi)
- Time zone: UTC+01:00 (CET)
  - Summer (DST): UTC+02:00 (CEST)
- Postal codes: 71154
- Dialling codes: 07032
- Vehicle registration: BB
- Website: www.nufringen.de

Nufringen (German pronunciation: [ˈnuːfʁɪŋən]) is a municipality ("Gemeinde") in the district of Böblingen in Baden-Württemberg in Germany.

== Location ==
Nufringen is situated in the Gäu region, 2 km (1.2 mi) of Herrenberg and 13 km (8.1 mi) of Böblingen at the Bundesstraße 14 and at the Stuttgart–Horb railway.

== History ==
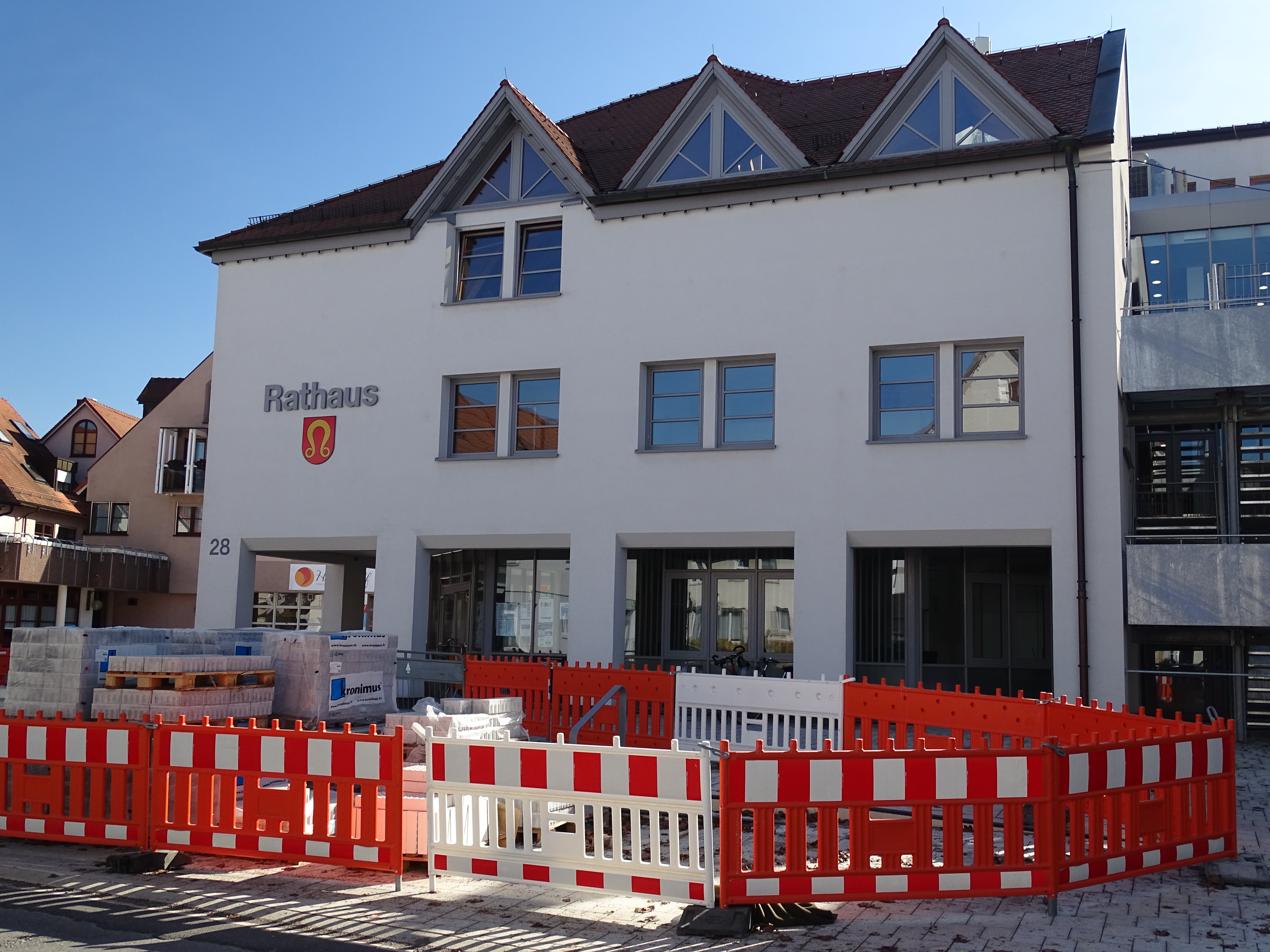
Town hall Nufringen

Nufringen was mentioned documentarily first time in the year 1182. In the 13th and 14th century the Pfalzgrafen von Tübingen have had impact on Nufringen until it was sold to Württemberg in 1382. The population was cut drastically because of the Thirty Years' War and the Black Death and did not become as big as before those events happened until the 18th century.

Nufringen belongs to the Oberamt Herrenberg since 1806. When the Stuttgart–Horb railway was opened, Nufringen was connected to the main transport networks. Nufringen became part of the Landkreis Böblingen because of administrative reform in 1938. In the World War II 40% of Nufringen were destroyed by an allied bombing raid. After the war Nufringen took a quick upswing.

== Politics ==
Since the last election in May 2014 the city council ("Gemeinderat") consists of 14 members. The turnout was 58,6%. The result was:

Freie Liste Nufringen (Free list of Nufringen)	5 seats
CDU	4 seats
Frauenliste Nufringen (Women's list of Nufringen)	2 seats
SPD	3 seats

The mayor is the chairman of the Gemeinderat.

== Coat of arms and flag ==
The coat of arms shows that the agriculture is an important part of Nufringen. Flag: Yellow-Red (Gold-Red).

== Hotels and gastronomy ==
There is a hotel ("Lamm") and a Musikcafé in Nufringen.

== Economy and infrastructure ==
=== Transport ===
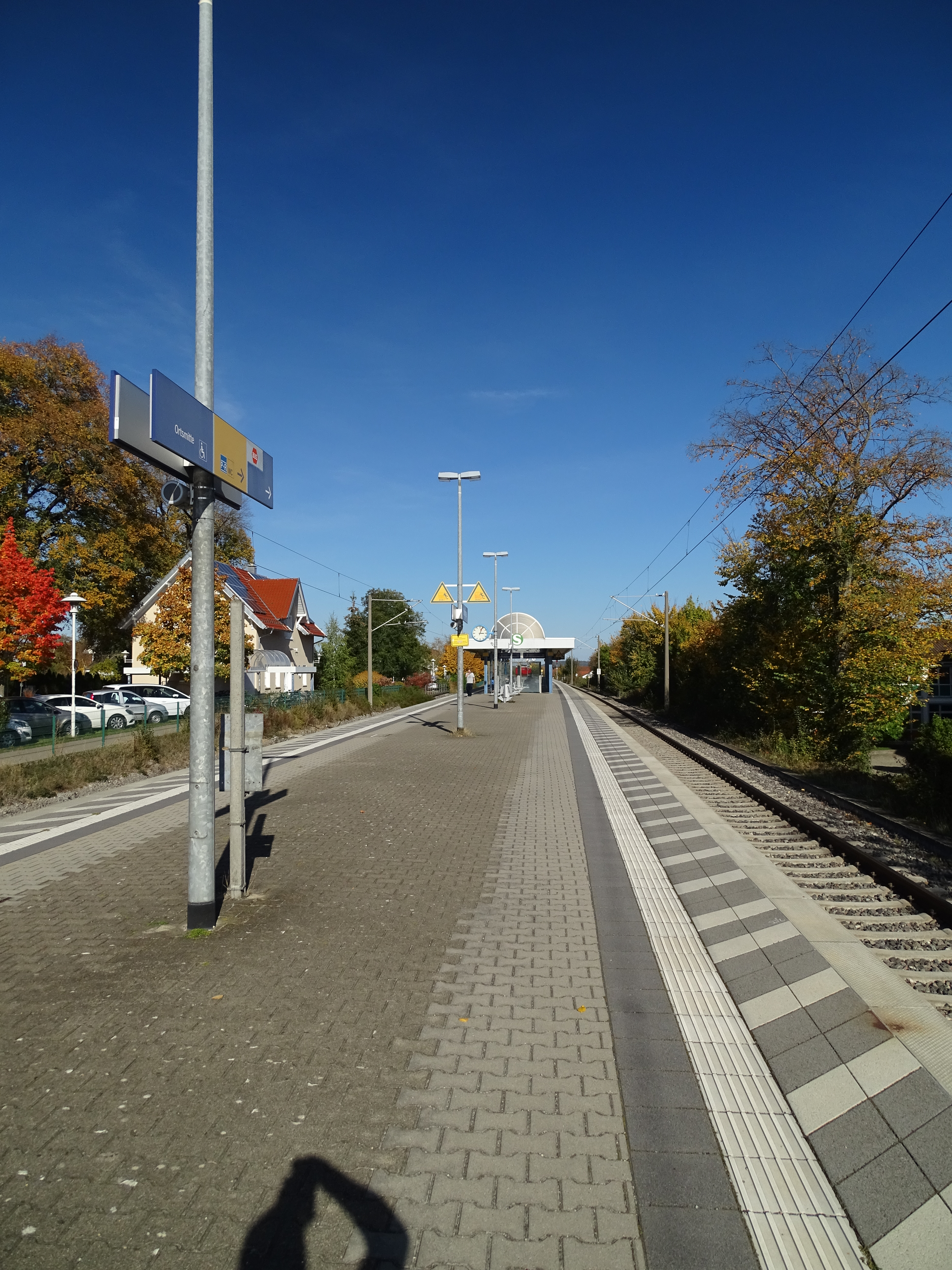
S-Bahn Station

Nufringen is situated on the Stuttgart–Horb railway, but only the trains of the line S1 (Kirchheim-Teck-Stuttgart-Herrenberg) of the S-Bahn Stuttgart stop at its station.

=== Education institutions ===
With the Wiesengrundschule Nufringen has got an own Grundschule, a Hauptschule and a Werkrealschule.

=== Settlement Geography ===
If Nufringen was a town, it could be called the best example of a commuter town, because many of the working people there leave the village in the daytime and come back when it becomes evening. There are not many people who go from outside into the Industrial area in northern Nufringen, because there are not enough jobs. The only reasons for the population growth are the connection to the S-Bahn and to the autobahn. The rest of Nufringen, which consists nearly just out of residential area, circles nearly around the station. Nearly no residential area is more than 800 m (2,600 ft) away from it, so that it can be reached easily. The newest development area in southern Nufringen does it, too. There are no other public transport facilities (except the bus station for buses in the night). The A 81 can be reached directly by the Bundesstraße 14, which is situated next to Nufringen. The few shops are also conveniently located for cars.

== Bibliography ==
- Roman Janssen: Nufringen: Eine Gäugemeinde im Wandel der Zeit, WEGRAhistorik-Verlag Stuttgart 1998, ISBN 3-929315-03-3
