= Grafenau, Württemberg =

Grafenau
- Municipality
- Coat of arms

- Location of Grafenau within Böblingen district
- Interactive map of Grafenau
- Location within Germany Location within Baden-Württemberg
- Coordinates: 48°42′51″N 8°54′40″E
- Country: Germany
- State: Baden-Württemberg
- Admin. region: Stuttgart
- District: Böblingen
- Subdivisions: 2

Government
  - Mayor (2020–28): Martin Thüringer

Area
  - Total: 13.04 km^{2} (5.03 sq mi)
- Elevation: 417 m (1,368 ft)

Population (2025-12-31)
  - Total: 6,582
  - Density: 504.8/km^{2} (1,307/sq mi)
- Time zone: UTC+01:00 (CET)
  - Summer (DST): UTC+02:00 (CEST)
- Postal codes: 71120
- Dialling codes: 07033
- Vehicle registration: BB
- Website: www.grafenau-wuertt.de

Grafenau (German pronunciation: [ɡʁaːfəˈnaʊ]) is a town in the district of Böblingen in Baden-Württemberg in Germany.

== Population ==
Year	Inhabitants
1961	3.289
1970	4.482
1980	5.100
1990	5.564
2000	6.565
2010	6.516
2015	6.735
