= Altdorf, Böblingen =

Altdorf
- Municipality
- Coat of arms

- Location of Altdorf within Böblingen district
- Interactive map of Altdorf
- Location within Germany Location within Baden-Württemberg
- Coordinates: 48°37′50″N 08°59′42″E
- Country: Germany
- State: Baden-Württemberg
- Admin. region: Stuttgart
- District: Böblingen

Government
  - Mayor (2020–28): Erwin Heller

Area
  - Total: 17.45 km^{2} (6.74 sq mi)
- Elevation: 483 m (1,585 ft)

Population (2025-12-31)
  - Total: 4,514
  - Density: 258.7/km^{2} (670.0/sq mi)
- Time zone: UTC+01:00 (CET)
  - Summer (DST): UTC+02:00 (CEST)
- Postal codes: 71155
- Dialling codes: 07031
- Vehicle registration: BB
- Website: www.altdorf-bb.de

Altdorf (German pronunciation: [ˈaltˌdɔʁf]) is a municipality in the district of Böblingen in Baden-Württemberg in Germany.

== Geography ==
=== Natural Space ===
Altdorf is located on the northern edge of the Schönbuch. The northern part has fields and meadows and it spreads on fertile clay soil. The southern part has a community forest and a state forest. The Rhätsandstein plateau of the Bromberg at the Schönbuch is in the middle. On that there is the highest point of the Schönbuch, which is 581 meters high. A small raised moor has formed at Birkensee from the Schönbuch.

== History ==
=== Name Origin ===
The origin of the name could be easily explained that it comes from altes Dorf ((in German), 'old village') but it would be unclear what the neues Dorf would be ((in German), 'new village'). But at the first mention from the Papal certificate from the year 1204 there it is called Alcdorf. From that the initial form Alachdorf was reconstructed. Due to that the community name could be translated to the protected place or the protective place. This could show that Altdorf was a Franconian military settlement at the Via Rheni in the past. But still the real origin of the name can no longer be determined with certainty today.
