= Böblingen (district) =

Coordinates: 48.7°N 9.01°E

- District
- Flag Coat of arms
- Country: Germany
- State: Baden-Württemberg
- Adm. region: Stuttgart
- Capital: Böblingen

Government
  - District admin.: Roland Bernhard

Area
  - Total: 617.83 km^{2} (238.55 sq mi)

Population (31 December 2022)
  - Total: 398,528
  - Density: 650/km^{2} (1,700/sq mi)
- Time zone: UTC+01:00 (CET)
  - Summer (DST): UTC+02:00 (CEST)
- Vehicle registration: BB, LEO
- Website: www.lrabb.de

Böblingen is a Landkreis (district) in the middle of Baden-Württemberg, Germany. Neighboring districts are (from west clockwise) Calw, Enz, Ludwigsburg, (district) Stuttgart, and the districts Esslingen, Reutlingen and Tübingen.

== History ==
The district was created in 1937 as the successor of the Oberamt Böblingen, which dates back to the Duchy of Württemberg, from the late 15th to the early 19th centuries. In 1973 the majority of the district Leonberg, as well as a few municipalities of the district Calw, were added to the district. A few municipalities were reassigned to the district Ludwigsburg.

== Geography ==
A part of the district is located in the Black Forest, other landscapes covered are the Oberes Gäu and the Schönbuch. The highest elevation is the 626 m high Kühlenberg in the municipality Jettingen; the lowest point, at 315 m, is in the valley of the Glems at the northern boundary of the district.

== Coat of arms ==
The deer antler in the top of the coat of arms is the symbol of Württemberg. Below is a banner (gonfanon) which is the symbol of the Counts of Tübingen.

== Towns and municipalities ==
Clickable map of municipalities in the district

Towns	Municipalities
1. Böblingen; 2. Herrenberg; 3. Holzgerlingen; 4. Leonberg; 5. Renningen; 6. Rutesheim; 7. Sindelfingen; 8. Waldenbuch; 9. Weil der Stadt	1. Aidlingen; 2. Altdorf bei Böblingen; 3. Bondorf; 4. Deckenpfronn; 5. Ehningen; 6. Gärtringen; 7. Gäufelden; 8. Grafenau; 9. Hildrizhausen; 10. Jettingen; 11. Magstadt; 12. Mötzingen; 13. Nufringen; 14. Schönaich; 15. Steinenbronn; 16. Weil im Schönbuch; 17. Weissach
Administrative districts	1. Aidlingen; 2. Altdorf bei Böblingen; 3. Bondorf; 4. Deckenpfronn; 5. Ehningen; 6. Gärtringen; 7. Gäufelden; 8. Grafenau; 9. Hildrizhausen; 10. Jettingen; 11. Magstadt; 12. Mötzingen; 13. Nufringen; 14. Schönaich; 15. Steinenbronn; 16. Weil im Schönbuch; 17. Weissach
1. Aidlingen/Grafenau; 2. Gärtringen/Ehningen; 3. Herrenberg; 4. Holzgerlingen; 5. Oberes Gäu; 6. Waldenbuch-Steinenbronn	1. Aidlingen; 2. Altdorf bei Böblingen; 3. Bondorf; 4. Deckenpfronn; 5. Ehningen; 6. Gärtringen; 7. Gäufelden; 8. Grafenau; 9. Hildrizhausen; 10. Jettingen; 11. Magstadt; 12. Mötzingen; 13. Nufringen; 14. Schönaich; 15. Steinenbronn; 16. Weil im Schönbuch; 17. Weissach
