= List of theatres in Baden-Württemberg =

This is a list of notable theatres in the German state of Baden-Württemberg, organized by administrative district.

== Freiburg ==
- BAAL novo – Offenburg
- Burgfestspiele Rötteln – Lörrach
- Harrys Depot – Freiburg im Breisgau
- Stadttheater Konstanz – Konstanz
- Theater Freiburg – Freiburg im Breisgau
- Theater im Marienbad – Freiburg im Breisgau
- Wallgraben-Theater – Freiburg im Breisgau

== Karlsruhe ==
- Badische Landesbühne – Bruchsal
- Badisches Staatstheater Karlsruhe – Karlsruhe
- Freilichtbühne Ötigheim – Ötigheim
- Klapsmühl' am Rathaus – Mannheim
- Mannheim National Theatre – Mannheim
- Naturtheater Grötzingen – Grötzingen
- Schlosstheater Schwetzingen – Karlsruhe
- Stadttheater Pforzheim – Pforzheim
- Theater Baden-Baden – Baden-Baden
- Theater & Orchester Heidelberg – Heidelberg
- Theater der Stadt Aalen – Aalen
- TiG7 – Mannheim

== Stuttgart ==
- Altes Theater – Heilbronn
- Freilichtspiele Neuenstadt – Neuenstadt am Kocher
- Freilichtspiele Schwäbisch Hall – Schwäbisch Hall
- Schlosstheater Ludwigsburg – Ludwigsburg
- Theater Heilbronn – Heilbronn
- Württembergische Landesbühne Esslingen – Esslingen am Neckar

=== City of Stuttgart ===
- Friedrichsbau
- Renitenztheater
- Schauspielbühnen Stuttgart
- Staatstheater Stuttgart
- Theater am Olgaeck
- Theaterhaus Stuttgart
- Theater tri-bühne
- Volkstheater
- Wilhelma-Theater

== Tübingen ==
- Landestheater Tübingen – Tübingen
- Naturtheater Hayingen – Hayingen
- Theater Lindenhof – Melchingen
- Theater Ulm – Ulm
- Waldbühne Sigmaringendorf – Sigmaringendorf
- Zimmertheater Tubingen – Tübingen
