= Aichtal =

- Town
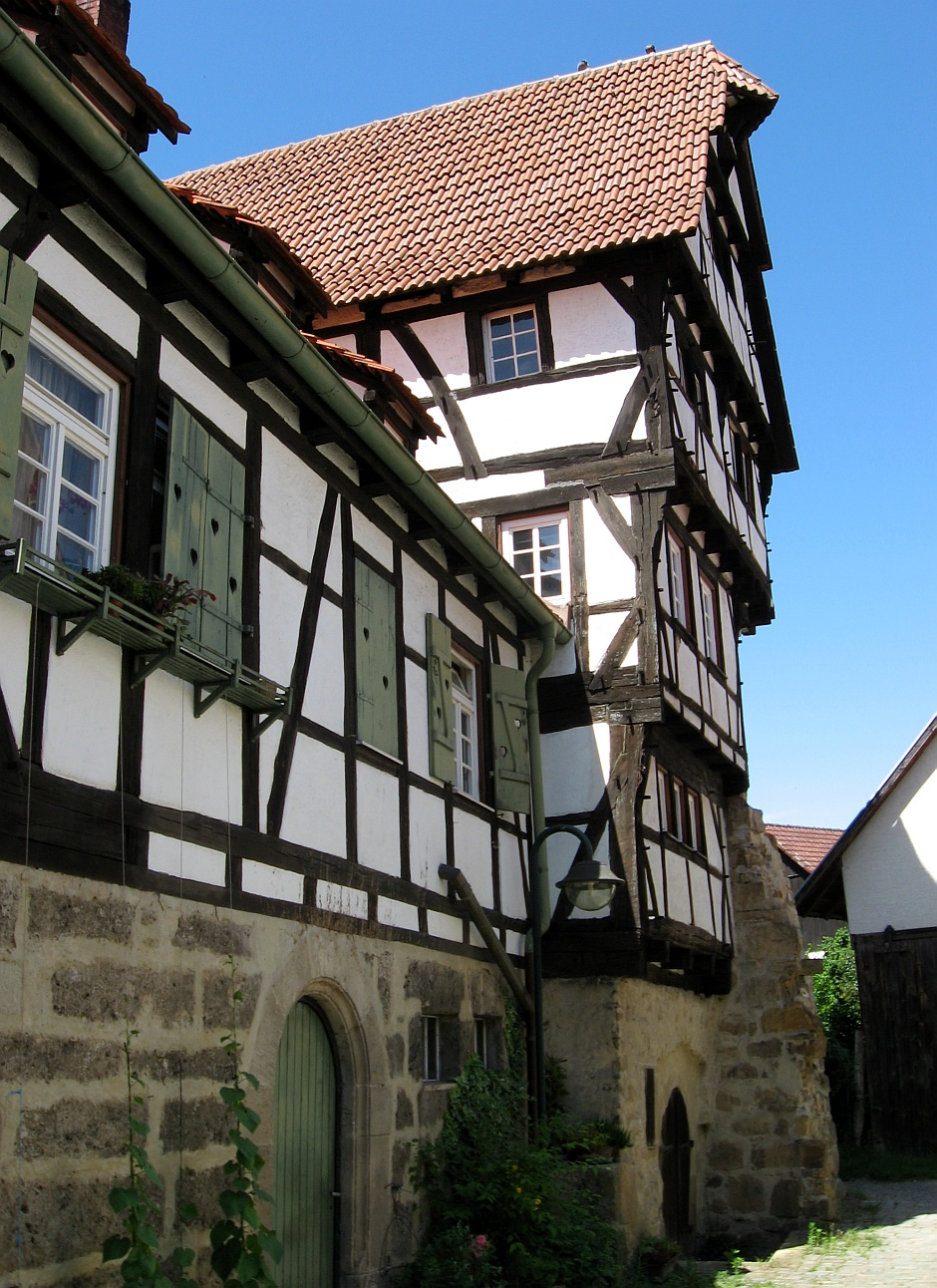

- Coat of arms

- Location of Aichtal within Esslingen district
- Interactive map of Aichtal
- Location within Germany Location within Baden-Württemberg
- Coordinates: 48°37′22″N 9°14′14″E
- Country: Germany
- State: Baden-Württemberg
- Admin. region: Stuttgart
- District: Esslingen
- Subdivisions: 3

Government
  - Mayor (2020–28): Sebastian Kurz (FW)

Area
  - Total: 23.6 km^{2} (9.1 sq mi)
- Elevation: 311 m (1,020 ft)

Population (2025-12-31)
  - Total: 9,643
  - Density: 409/km^{2} (1,060/sq mi)
- Time zone: UTC+01:00 (CET)
  - Summer (DST): UTC+02:00 (CEST)
- Postal codes: 72631
- Dialling codes: 07127
- Vehicle registration: ES
- Website: www.aichtal.de

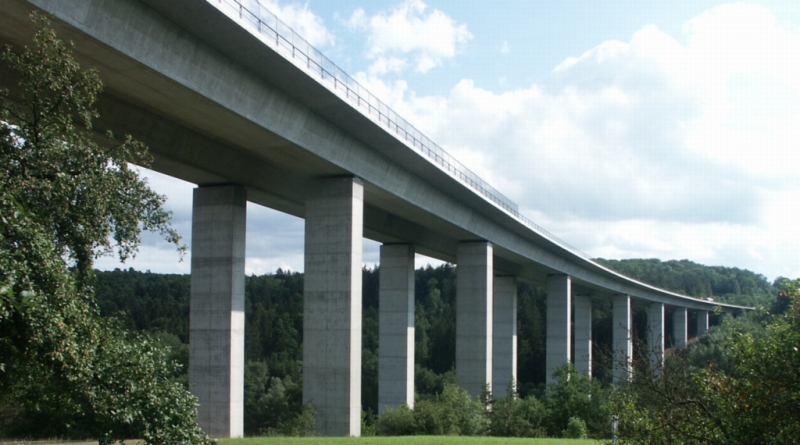
Aichtal bridge

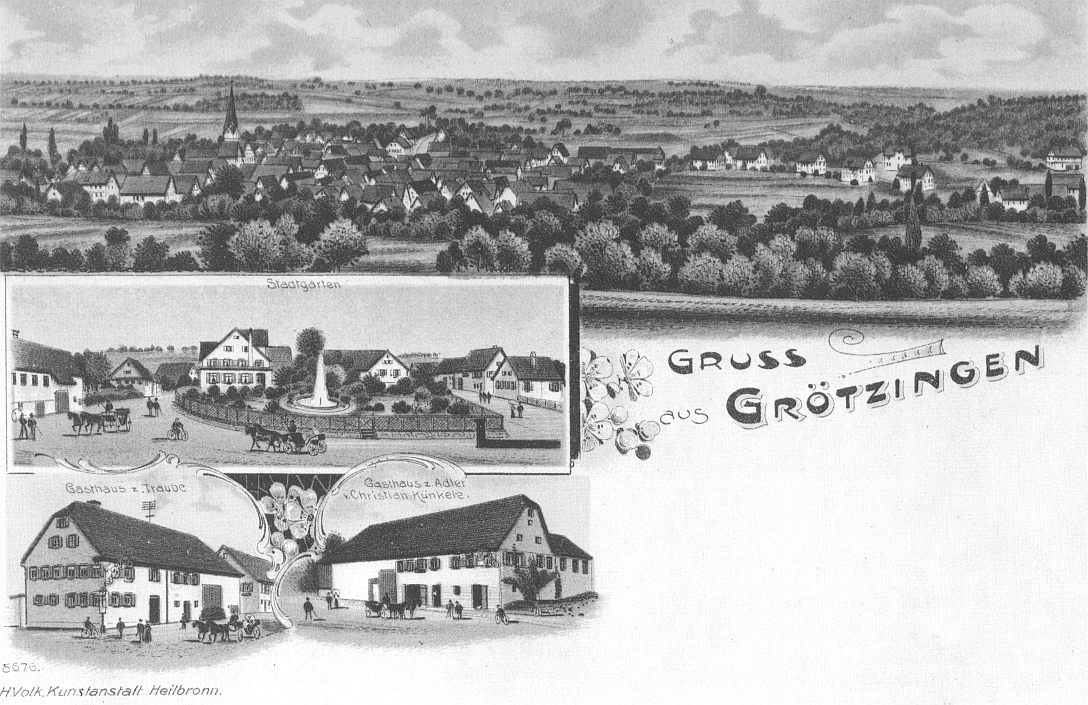
In 1885

Aichtal (German pronunciation: [ˈaɪçtaːl]; Swabian: Oechtal) is a town in the district of Esslingen in Baden-Württemberg in southern Germany. It is located 18 km south of Stuttgart. It belongs to the Stuttgart Region (until 1992 Region Mittlerer Neckar) and the European Metropolitan Region Stuttgart. The municipality, which was created in 1975 as part of the municipal reform and consists of the three districts Grötzingen, Aich and Neuenhaus, has a population of around 10,000.

== Geography ==
=== Geographical location ===
Aichtal is situated at the southern edge of the Filder plain in the valley of the Aich, a left tributary of the Neckar. It is separated from the Neckar valley by the ridges of Galgenberg, Kleinbergle and Schaichberg. The district Neuenhaus, situated in the angle of the valley fork formed by Aich and Schaich, belongs mostly to the Naturpark Schönbuch. The tuberous marl slopes of the Aich valley are covered with meadows and fruit orchards. The town area extends from 295 meters above sea level at the Grötzingen sewage plant to 498 meters above sea level on the Betzenberg in the Schönbuch.

=== Expansion of the city area ===
The city covers an area of 23.64 square kilometres, of which 3.48 square kilometres are inhabited. With 10.49 square kilometres, forest areas cover almost half of the district, including the 8.12 square kilometres of the Schönbuch. The extension of the city area is 11.0 kilometres from west to east along the river Aich and 3.4 kilometres in a north–south direction.

=== Neighbouring communities ===
Neighbouring communities are Filderstadt in the north, Wolfschlugen in the northeast, Nürtingen in the east, Neckartailfingen and Schlaitdorf in the south, Walddorfhäslach in the southwest and Waldenbuch (District of Böblingen) in the west.

=== City division ===
Aichtal consists of the three districts Grötzingen (about 4300 inhabitants; 7,68 square kilometres), Aich (about 3100 inhabitants; 6,11 square kilometres) and Neuenhaus (about 2200 inhabitants; 9,85 square kilometres). The spatially separated settlement Rudolfshöhe belongs to Aich, the residential area Bergwirtshaus is attached to the district Grötzingen.

== History ==
On 1 January 1975, during the administrative reform, the new town of Grötzingen was founded from the town of Grötzingen and the independent communities of Aich and Neuenhaus. After protests from Aich and Neuenhaus, where parts of the population felt downgraded by this name, the town was renamed Aichtal on August 1, 1978.

=== Administrative affiliation ===
With the implementation of the administrative subdivision of Württemberg in the Kingdom of Württemberg, the town Grötzingen and the two villages Aich and Neuenhaus were assigned to the Oberamt Nürtingen in 1806. During the district reform during the NS period in Württemberg they came to the Landkreis of the same name in 1938. In 1945, the towns became part of the American occupation zone and thus belonged to the newly founded state Württemberg-Baden, which was absorbed into the present state of Baden-Württemberg in 1952. In 1973 the District Reform in Baden-Wuerttemberg took place, in which the towns became part of the district of Esslingen.

=== Grötzingen ===
Grötzinger Crest

People have lived in this area since the Neolithic Age. From this time there are finds of stone tools and pottery shards.

In a document of the king Heinrich IV in 1075 Gretzingan was mentioned for the first time. This document was about the vineyards in Grötzingen, which belonged to the monastery Hirsau. The Alemannic settlement arose at the latest in the 7th century and was located in today's Altgrötzinger valley. The name probably goes back to a clan leader called Gretz.

Probably in the first half of the 13th century, one of the Grötzinger lords built a moated castle with a farm in the southern part of the village marker on the little river Aich. The foundation of the town of Grötzingen took place around 1275 by knight Diepold von Bernhausen, who supported king Rudolf von Habsburg and built the town as a fortification against the Württemberg Nürtingen, which was gaining influence. In 1304 Grötzingen was first documented as a town, the inhabitants of the original village moved into its walls, the former village fell into disrepair. In 1337 Diepolds son sold the town Grötzingen to Württemberg.

From the 14th to the 16th century Grötzingen was the seat of a Oberamt, to which Aich, Neckartailfingen, Neckartenzlingen, Neuenhaus and Wolfschlugen belonged. Afterwards Grötzingen came to the office Nürtingen.

In the Schmalkaldic War the inhabitants of Grötzingen had sold their cannons in 1546 due to lack of money. When plundering soldiers approached, they dug out wooden well pipes and pushed them into the embrasures of the city wall. Since the approaching soldiers mistook them for cannons, they moved on without attacking the town.

In the years 1634/1635 243 Grötzinger and 194 Neckartailfinger citizens, who sought refuge here after the destruction of their town, fell victim to the plague. After the Thirty Years' War the town counted only one third of the population - Grötzingen went from the second richest to the poorest place of the Nürtingen office. The need forced many poor inhabitants to emigrate already in the middle of the 18th century, mainly to North America.

In 1845 a big fire destroyed 13 buildings in the town centre, including the town hall and the schoolhouse.

=== Aich ===
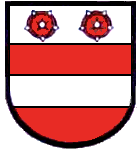
Aicher Crest

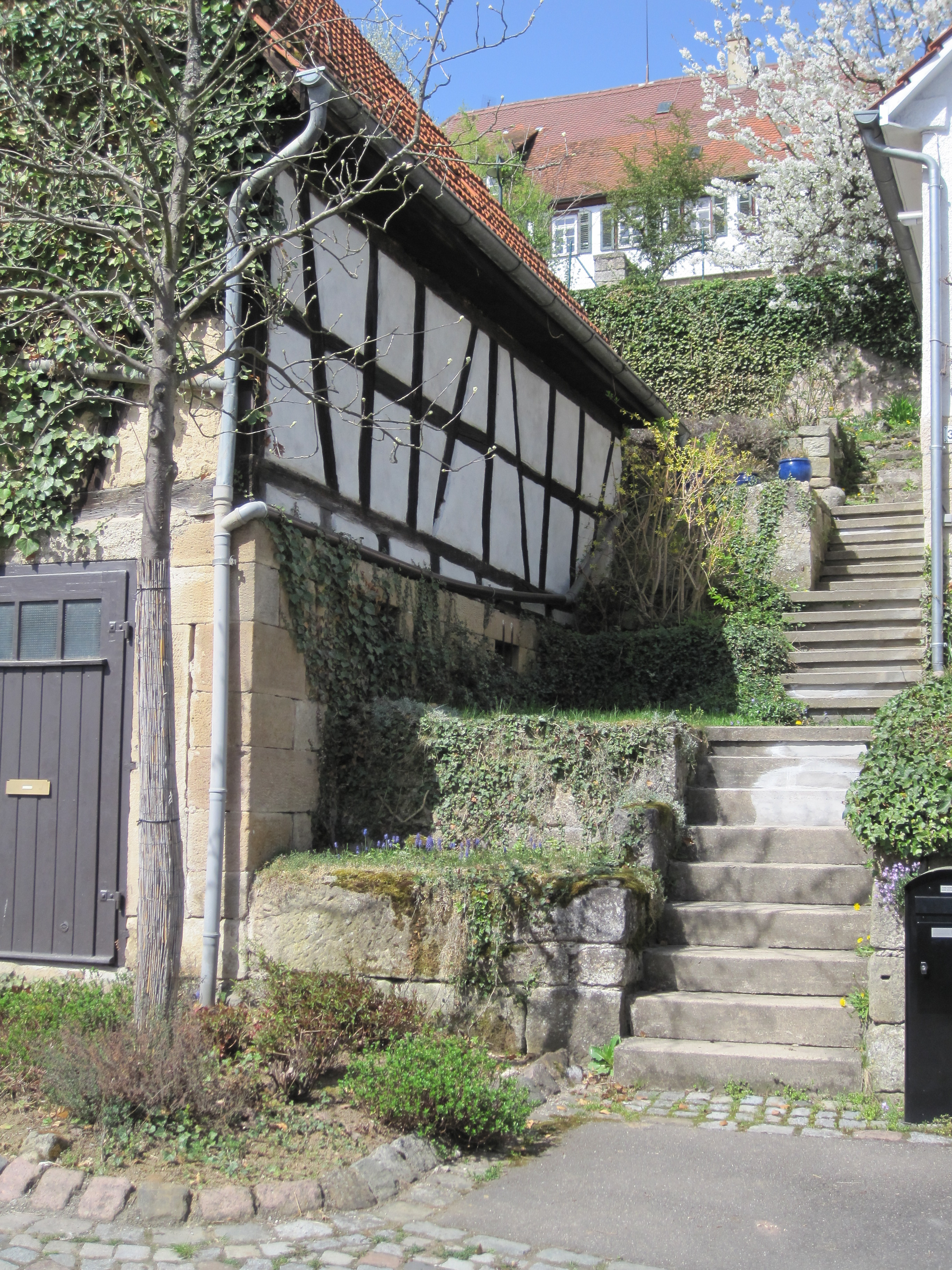

Aich was first mentioned in 1103 in a deed of donation by the brothers Wernher and Wolfram von Eichacha. In 1312 a property of the lords of Bernhausen in Aich can be proven, but sold it in 1319 to the women's benefice of the parish church. The "Vogte von Aich" appear as local nobility. They were knightly servants of the Counts Palatine of Tübingen (Herrenberg line). The reeves of Aich also had estates in Neuenhaus and Schlaitdorf. In 1369 the village was acquired by the Reutlingen Sperwern for 550 pounds heller. They then sold this to Württemberg in 1382 with the Herrenberg dominion. Württemberg was given to the Grötzingen Amt, later, after its dissolution at the beginning of the 16th century, to the Amt of Nürtingen. In 1383 the village counted twelve "Hüblin" (small farms). The oldest document in the district archive of Esslingen testifies 1404 the enfeoffment of Heinz Stoll of Bernhausen with the Bombachmühle, a Mill for the Aich population; this mill can be traced back to 1369.

In the South German town war of 1449 the village was largely burned down by the Reutlingeners. In 1586 Aich was again almost completely destroyed by fire and was rebuilt under the direction of the ducal master builder Heinrich Schickhardt. The place was considered the geographical center of the duchy of Württemberg.

On April 20, 1945, the place was taken and looted by French soldiers, mostly Moroccans.

=== Neuenhaus ===
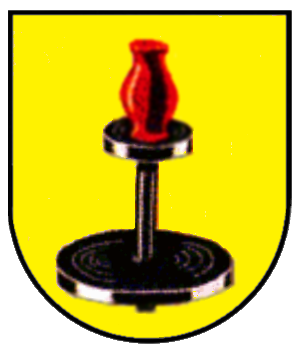
Neuenhaus Crest

At Betzenberg there are several burial mounds from the Hallstatt period as well as numerous remains and a cemetery from the Roman period.

In 1312 Neuenhaus was first mentioned in documents as Neues Haus (zem Niwenhuse). It was a water castle of the County Palatine of Tübingen, next to which a manorial village was established. In 1347 Neuenhaus was already sold to Württemberg due to lack of money. Until the middle of the 15th century the Speth had the castle as a fiefdom. On the foundations of the old moated castle, the half-timbered house Schlössle was built around 1600.

The field name Brustelberg on the slope of the Betzenberg refers to the fact that there was a medieval castle here, which was inhabited until 1670 and then fell into decay. After the death of the last owner, the childless Junker Phillip Grempp von Freudenstein, the castle became the property of Württemberg in 1641, Friedrich von Ragowitz received it as a Kunkel loan. His widow was the last inhabitant of the castle, when she died in 1670 the castle was already in a state of great decay.

From the 14th to the middle of the 20th century the pottery trade was practised in Neuenhaus. The pottery clay came from the nearby Betzenberg. Duke Ulrich recruited master pottery makers from Lower Franconia, to whom he promised free wood from the Schönbuch. In the year 1848 there were 78 Hafnermeister in the place, i.e. almost two thirds of the employed persons practiced this occupation. This is how the popular Swabian place name Häfner-Nuihausa, which already appeared in official records in 1720, in contrast to the Katholisch-Nuihausa (Neuhausen auf den Fildern). In the neighbouring villages the inhabitants of Neuenhaus are usually simply called Häfner.

Another source of income were crabs which were caught in the Schaich and regularly sold as far as Stuttgart and Tübingen. In addition, wine was cultivated on the Uhlberg until 1832.

=== Urban and population development ===
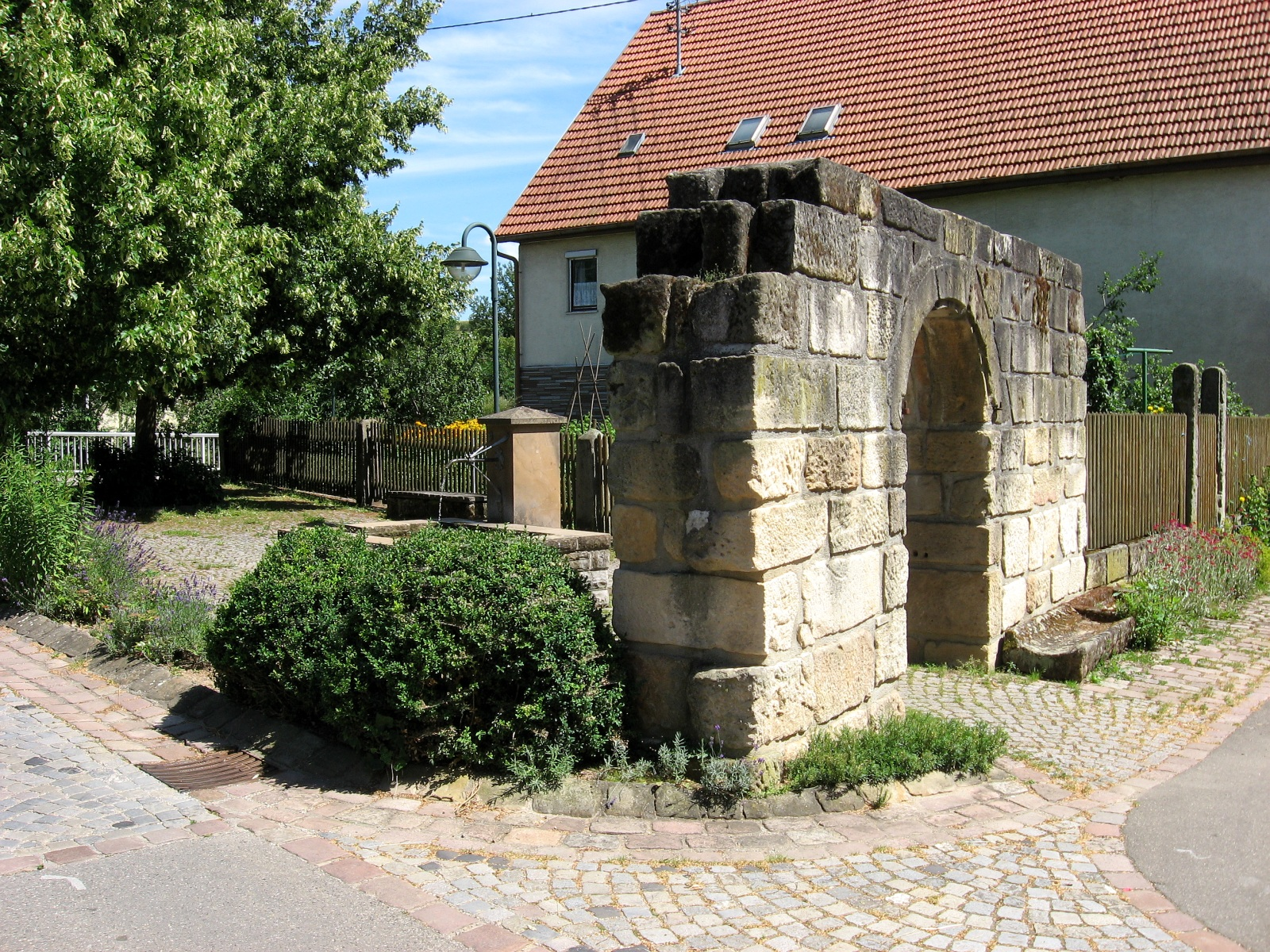
Reconstructed section of the Grötzinger city wall

In Grötzingen and Aich, new residential areas on southern slopes above the town centres were developed from the post-war years until the 1980s. In Grötzingen these are the Schönblick settlement (1948) and the Blumensiedlung (1971), in Aich the Sulzäcker (1956) and the Rudolfshöhe (1957) situated northeast of the village as well as the Steinenäcker and the Gemeindeberg (1973). Neuenhaus expanded from 1965 to the 1980s with new buildings along the connecting road from Waldenbuch to Nürtingen, in Grörach and in the Sandäckern and on the slope of the Betzenberg. From 1969 onwards, the Aichholz industrial estate was created north of Aich. In 1976 the company Aldi settled in the neighbouring Riedwiesen.

At the end of the 1990s, the Schönblicksiedlung was extended by the Froschegert development area, as was the flower settlement around the Hoher Rain. On the north-eastern outskirts of Neuenhaus, new building areas have also been created in recent years. Currently, the Weckholder residential area between Grötzingen and Rudolfshöhe is being developed as a further residential area.

In 2004, 4310 households were counted in Aichtal, which corresponds to an average household size of 2.3 persons. The average age of the population was 39.9 years.

The population development in Aichtal since 1572 and 1834
	1572	1654	1703	1745	1803	1810	1824	1834	1843	1852	1861	1871	1885	1895	1900	1905	1910	1919
Grötzingen	450	258	448	593	870	893	945	958	967	977	900	933	882	804	784	845	856	870
Aich							728	778	800	791	725	737	694	626	634	629	624	647
Neuenhaus							565	624	668	776	674	772	838	748	724	718	716	793
total							2.238	2.360	2.435	2.544	2.299	2.442	2.414	2.178	2.142	2.189	2.196	2.310

	1925	1933	1939	1946	1950	1956	1961	1965	1970	1975	1980	1985	1990	1995	2000	2005	2010	2015
Grötzingen	869	831	848	1.239	1.283		1.862		2.453									
Aich	635	662	660	909	971		1.600		2.224									
Neuenhaus	806	867	864	1.089	1.141		1.413		1.767									
total	2.310	2.360	2.372	3.237	3.395	3.905	4.875	6.009	6.444	7.336	8.195	8.517	8.709	9.178	9.531	9.771	9.716	10.124

=== Religions ===
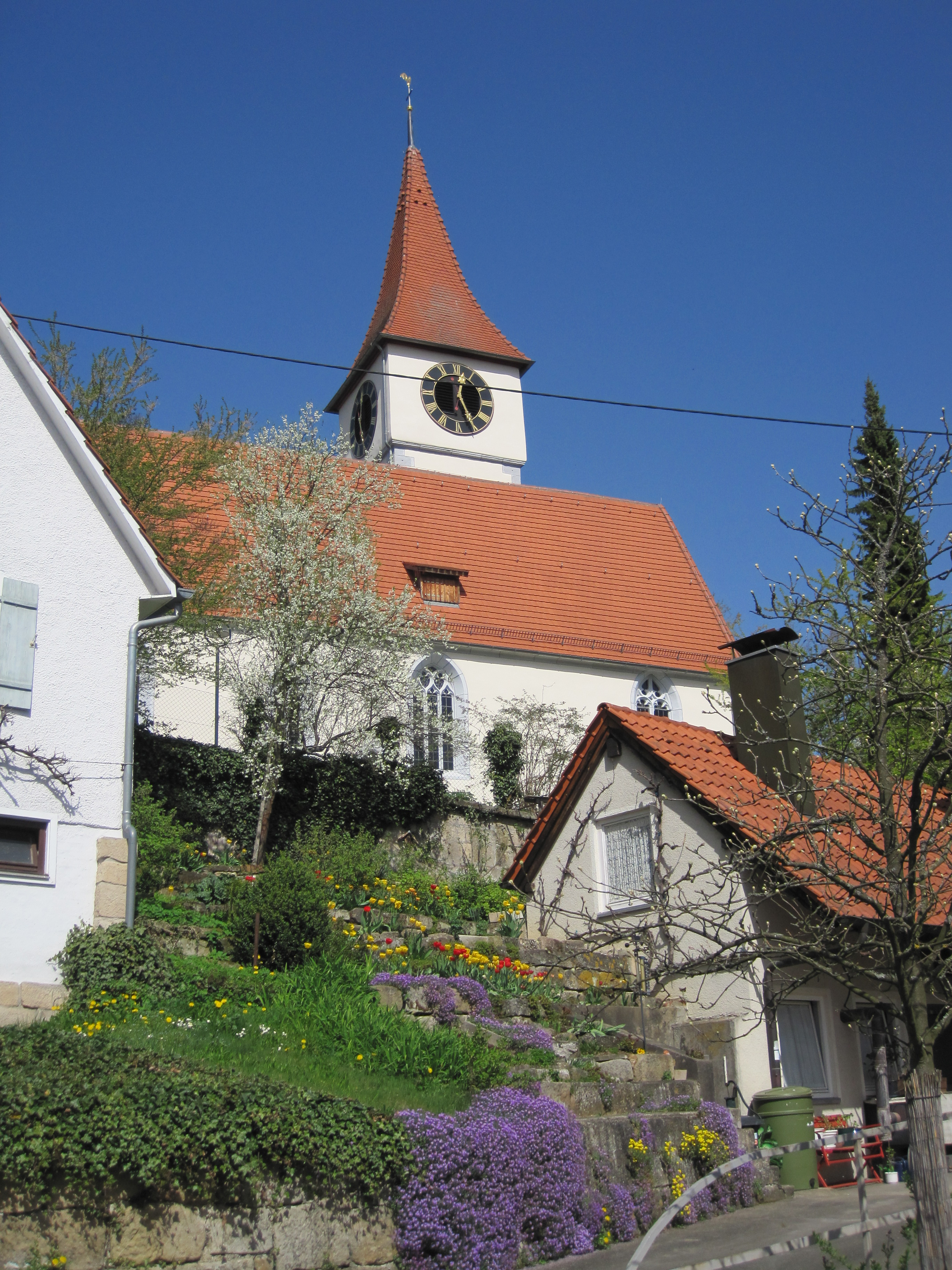
Church in Aich

Aichtal has been predominantly Protestant since the Reformation. However, since 1954 there has been a Catholic congregation in Grötzingen and a New Apostolic congregation in Neuenhaus. In addition, there is a congregation of the Protestant Regional Church Fellowship Württembergischer Brüderbund in Neuenhaus. The Protestant congregations of Grötzingen, Aich, and Neuenhaus belong to the Kirchenbezirk Nürtingen of the Evangelische Landeskirche in Württemberg, while the Catholic congregation of Grötzingen-Harthausen belongs to the Deanery of Esslingen-Nürtingen of the Diocese of Rottenburg-Stuttgart.

In Grötzingen a church is attested in 1280, which originally belonged to Neckartailfingen and where in 1375 an own parish was established. Count Ulrich V. donated the church to the hospital in Kirchheim in 1444/45. Today's town church was built around 1460 and underwent major changes in the 19th and 20th centuries. A parish church in Aich is already mentioned in 1275. Via the Denkendorf Monastery it came under Württemberg rule. Today's Albanus Church was built at the beginning of the 16th century by converting a late Gothic choir side tower. In 1343, a chapel in Neuenhaus was named, which belonged to the parish of Weil im Schönbuch. The right of patronage was held by Kloster Bebenhausen. In the 16th century Neuenhaus became an independent parish. Today's church is a late Gothic building from 1480, which was rebuilt several times and still has a choir with ribbed vaulting.

== Politics ==
=== Administrative headquarters ===
The administrative headquarters and meeting place of the municipal council is the town hall in the Aich district, built in 1966.

=== City Council ===
The municipal council in Aichtal has 18 members. The local elections in Baden-Württemberg 2019 led to the following official final result. The local council consists of the elected honorary local councillors and the mayor as chairman. The mayor is entitled to vote in the municipal council.

Parties		% 2019	Seats; 2019	% 2014	seats 2014
FUW	Freie Unabhängige Wählervereinigung	26,36	5	23,59	4
CDU/BLA	Christlich Demokratische Union Deutschlands/Bürgerliste Aichtal	17,15	3	22,35	4
GRÜNE	Bündnis 90/Die Grünen	23,83	4	22,16	4
SPD/UL	Sozialdemokratische Partei Deutschlands/Unabhängige Liste	14,99	3	17,46	3
LIBERALE	Aichtaler Liberale Bürger/FDP	17,67	3	14,44	3
Total		100	18	100	18
Voter participation		66,62 %		56,58 %	

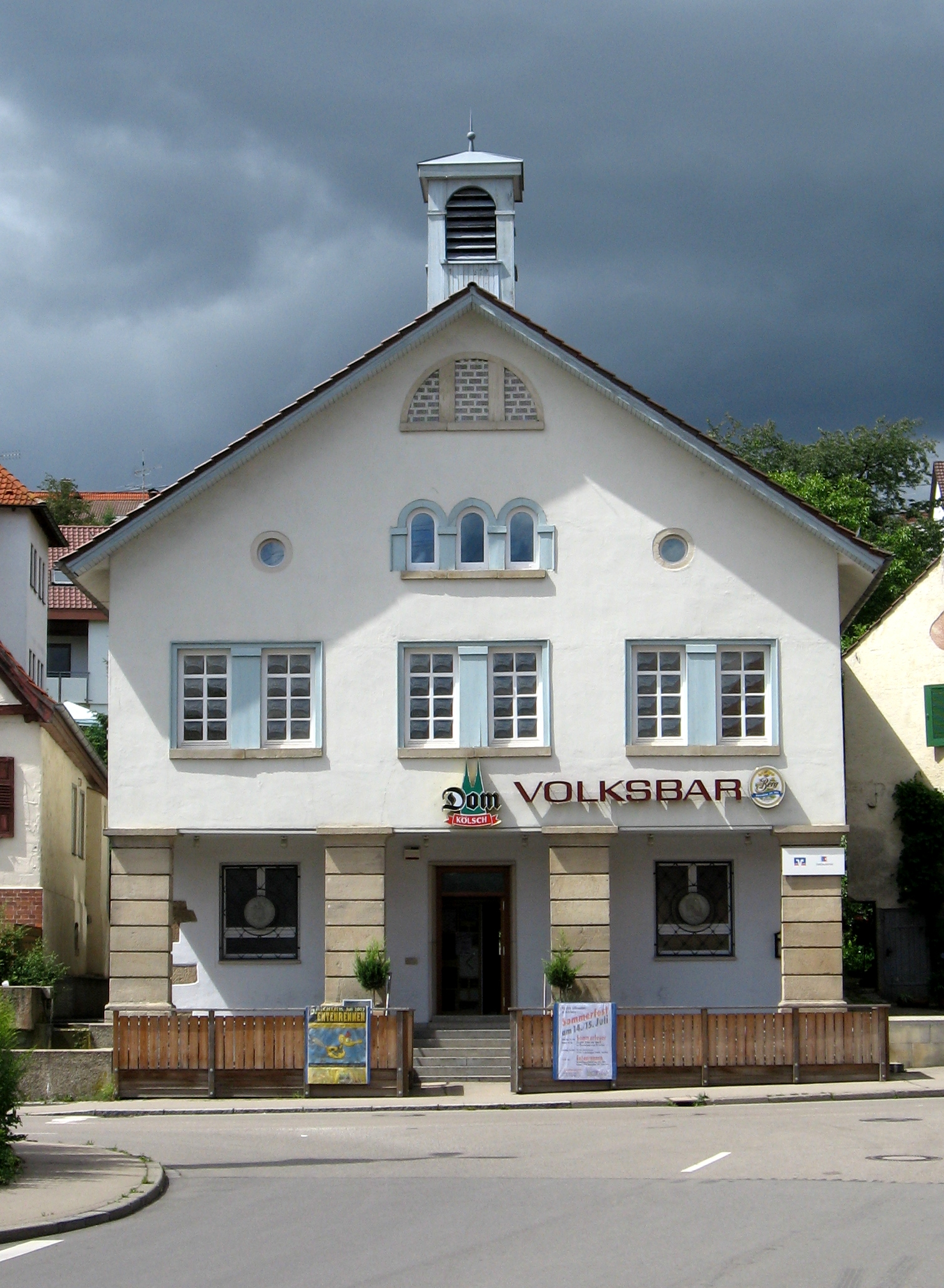
Old Aich town hall

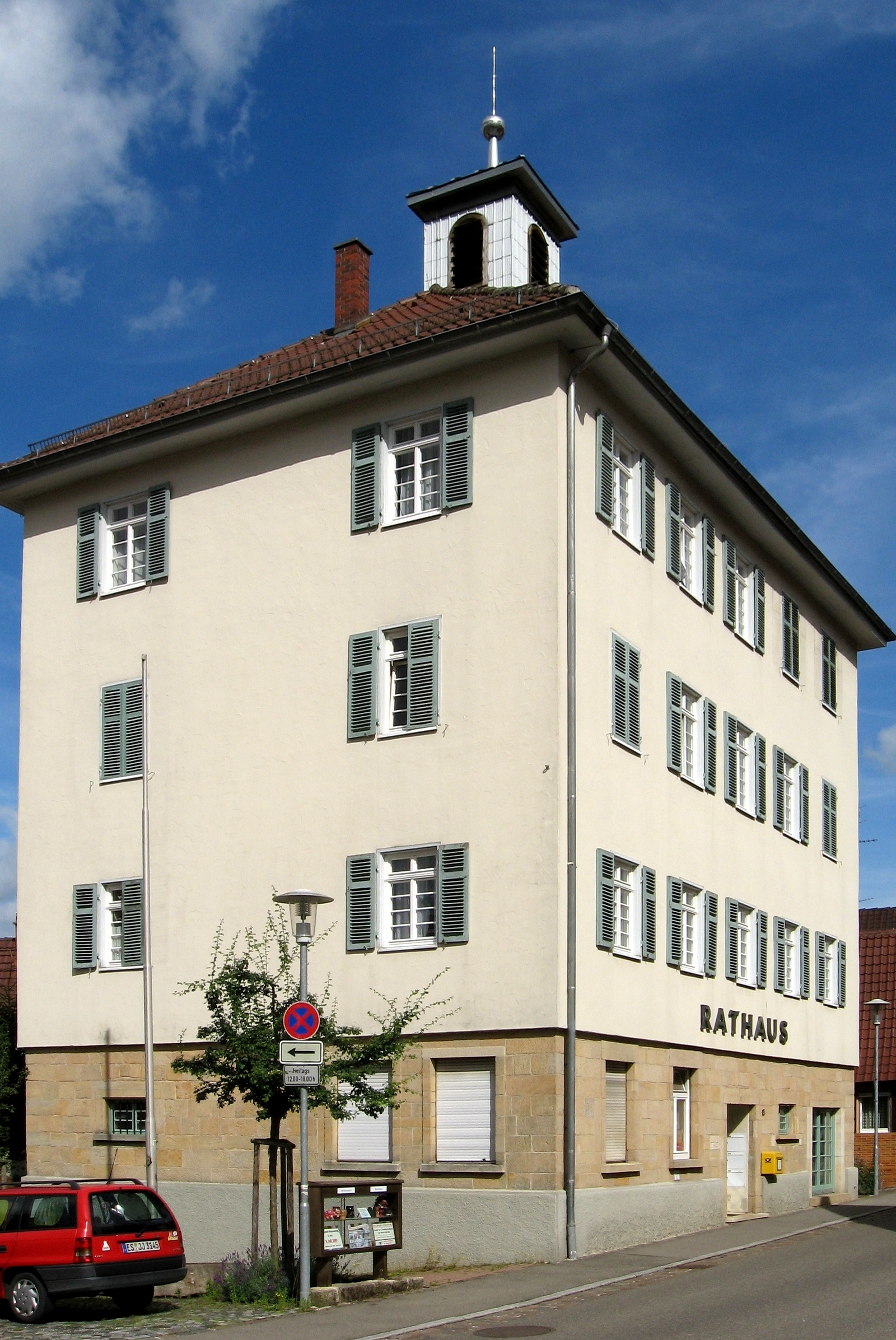
Neuenhaus town hall

=== Mayor ===
The mayor is elected in Baden-Württemberg for a term of office of eight years. Lorenz Kruß was elected as the new mayor on 22 April 2012 with 50.24% of the valid votes.

- 1976–1992: Manfred Stierle
- 1992–2012: Klaus Herzog
- seit 8. Juli 2012: Lorenz Kruß

=== Crest ===
blazoning: "Under a golden (yellow) shield head, in it a black stag rod, divided five times by green and gold."

Aichtal bears the coat of arms of the former town of Grötzingen, which can be traced back to 1535. It is based on the seal of the town founder Diepold von Bernhausen, supplemented by the Württemberg stag pole. Similar coats of arms can be found in the present-day town Filderstadt and the former parish Bittenfeld, where at times the nobility of Bernhausen also ruled.

The town flag has the colours green-yellow (green-gold). Coat of arms and flag were awarded to the town of Aichtal in 1978 by the district office of Esslingen.

=== Town twinning ===
- Sümeg (Hungary), since 1990
- Ligny-en-Barrois (France), since 12 September 1998

== Culture and sightseeing ==
=== Buildings ===
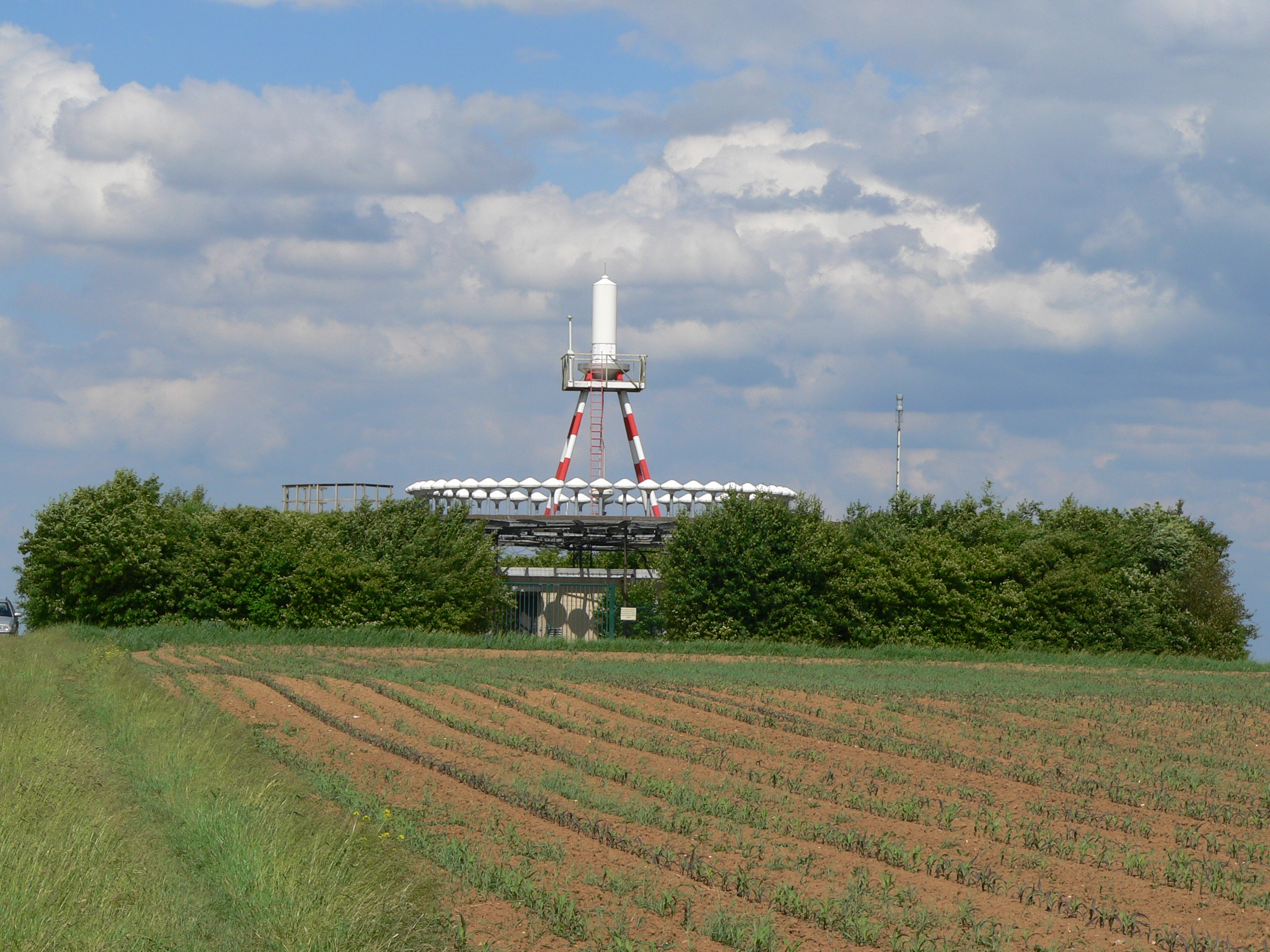

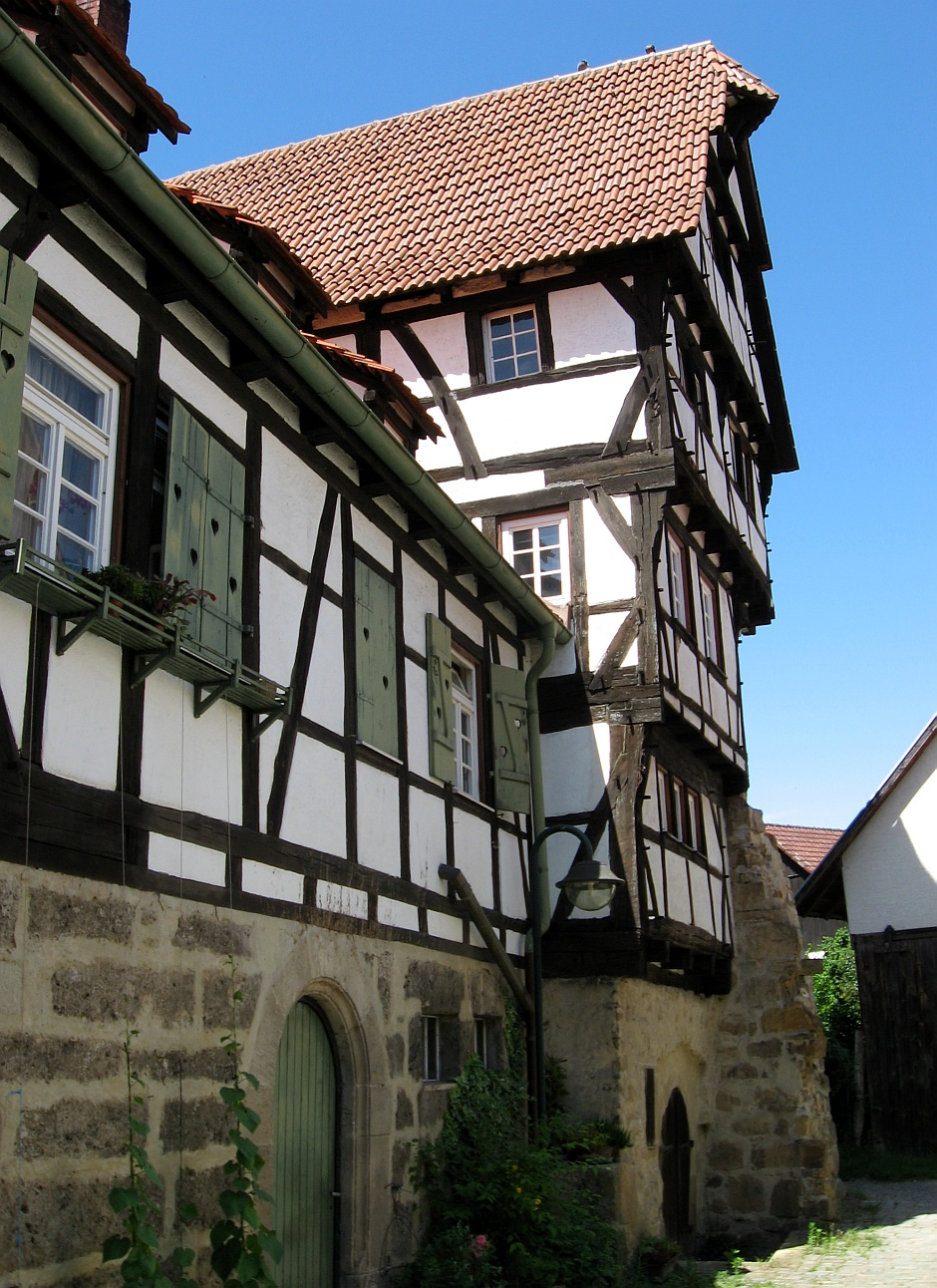
half-timbered house from the 15th century in the Burgstraße

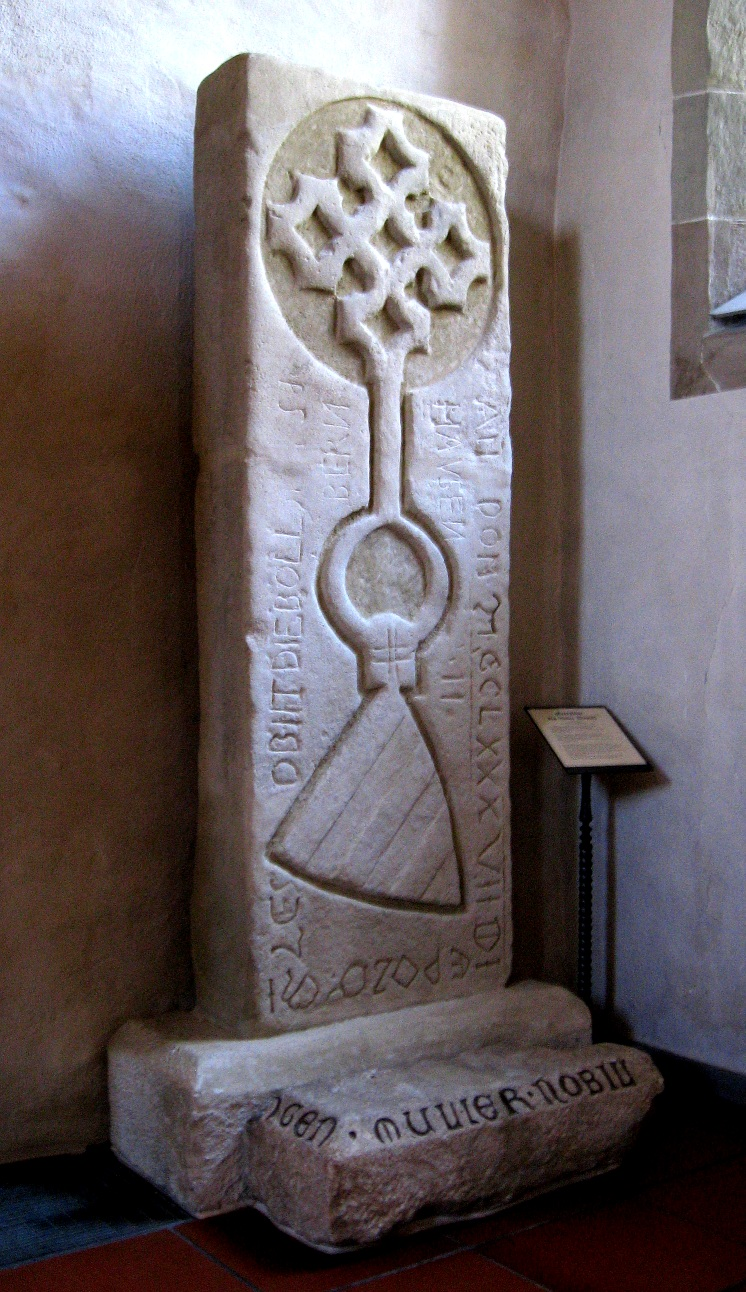
Gravestone of the town founder Diepold von Bernhausen († 1286) in the Grötzinger town church

Since the town of Grötzingen has been spared major destruction in the past, several half-timbered houses from the 15th and 16th century have been preserved. Among the sights are the building Hindenburgstraße 17 from 1558 on the market place, which served as a schoolhouse from 1738 to 1820 and is used today as a Protestant parish hall, as well as the parsonage from 1683. The town church, which was built around 1460 as a gothic new building of a much older church, was strongly changed in the 19th and 20th century. The town founder Diepold von Bernhausen, who died in 1286 near Hedelfingen in the battle against Württemberg, was buried in the Romanesque predecessor church. Only remnants of the town wall, which was demolished at the beginning of the 19th century and had twelve towers and three gates, have been preserved. From 1968 onwards, parts of it - including the prison and powder tower - were rebuilt.

The Aichtal Bridge, built from 1979 to 1983, is with a length of 1161 meters the longest road bridge in Germany. It spans the Aich and Bombach Valley between Aich and Neuenhaus at a height of 52 meters above the valley floor. On the Betzenberg, on the western boundary of the district above Waldenbuch, is the Waldenbuch telecommunications tower, built in 1976, which is visible from afar at a height of 146 meters. Another remarkable building from more recent times is the VHF omnidirectional range on the Kleinbergle, which is used for air navigation.

=== Nature ===
Aichtal is located directly at the Naturpark Schönbuch, the northeastern part of which belongs to the city area. You can reach Tübingen or Herrenberg on foot or by bike on marked hiking trails without leaving the forest. The Schaichvalley, which is under nature protection, stretches between the Betzenberg and the Schaichberg for over eight kilometres from Neuenhaus to Dettenhausen. The lush riparian vegetation as well as lakes and ponds characterise the scenic valley, which is home to rare species such as the kingfisher, the fire salamander and the dipper.

North of Neuenhaus is the Uhlberg with the observation tower Uhlbergturm and barbecue area, which can also be reached directly on foot from Aich. The Siebenmühlental begins at the Burkhardtsmühle, at the confluence of the Reichenbach and the Aich, through which an asphalt hiking trail leads to Leinfelden.

=== Theatre ===
Since 1954 the Grötzinger Galgenberg (Gallows Hill) has been used as a venue for theatre performances. The Naturtheater Grötzingen performs two plays there every summer, one for children and one for adults. Under the concrete dome built in 1978 there is room for 850 spectators.

=== Museums ===
The Grötzingen Museum of Local History and the Neuenhaus Hafner Museum provide an insight into the past of the two towns.

=== Sports ===
Aichtal has three football clubs, two tennis clubs and two water sports clubs. Two fishing clubs, a shooting club, a table tennis club, a volleyball club as well as a ski and an aikido club round off the sporting offer. The indoor swimming pool in Neuenhaus, which has existed since 1974, was largely demolished in the mid-1990s, rebuilt and reopened as a garden indoor pool. The exposed location of the indoor swimming pool on the edge of Schönbuch allows a view over the three parts of the town up to the Three Imperial Mountains.

=== Music ===
Furthermore, there are two music clubs in Aich and Neuenhaus, the Spielmannszug of the fire brigade department Grötzingen, three choirs and an accordion club in Grötzingen.

=== Regular events ===
Among the larger events known in the region are the Grötzinger spring market (end of March), the Bock beer festival in Neuenhaus (May), the summer festival of the music association in Aich (July), the Grötzinger Städtlesfest (end of July/beginning of August) and the Häfner village festival in Neuenhaus (September).

== Economy and Infrastructure ==
=== Traffic ===
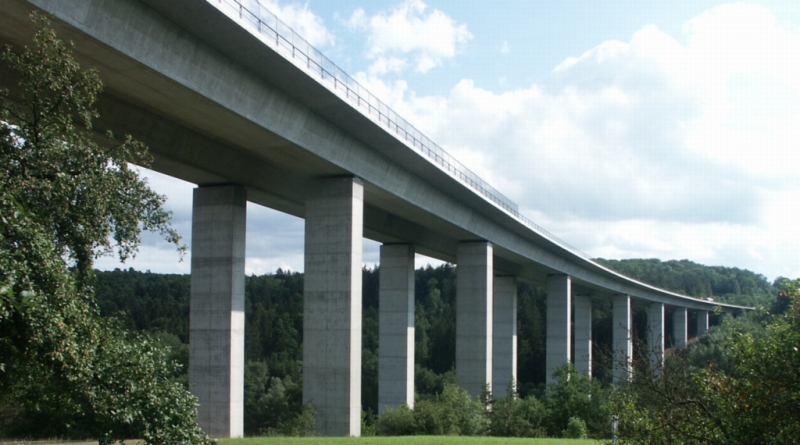
Aichtalbridge

The city can be reached by car from Stuttgart, Reutlingen and Tübingen in about 25 minutes via B 27 or 312. The Stuttgart Airport and the nearest junctions to the A8 are about ten kilometres away. The B 27 runs on the four-lane Aichtalbridge between Aich and Neuenhaus, the B 312 on a two-lane bridge between Grötzingen and Aich. A connection to the B 27 exists only from and to Stuttgart, the connection from and in the direction of Tübingen, which has been demanded by the city and industry for years, has not been realized yet. The state road 1185 leads from Nürtingen via Aichtal and Waldenbuch to Böblingen.

The bus lines 167, 805, 808 and 809 connect Aichtal with Filderstadt-Bernhausen (connection to the S-Bahn), Nürtingen (Neckar-Alb-Bahn) and Neckartenzlingen. The operator of these lines is the bus company Melchinger, based in Aichtal. On weekdays, line 760 of FMO also runs two to three times a day from Neuenhaus via Waldenbuch and Böblingen to the Mercedes-Benz plant in Sindelfingen. All public transport is available at a uniform fare within the VVS.

=== Employment ===
As of 30 June 2010, 3654 people were employed subject to social security contributions, of which 3113, i.e. 85 percent, worked as commuters outside of Aichtal. Conversely, there were 2013 commuters who lived outside of Aichtal, so that a total of 2554 employees subject to social security contributions were working in Aichtal. Of these, 71 percent worked in the manufacturing industry and 29 percent in the service sector. According to figures from the Federal Employment Agency, an average of 204 people were unemployed in 2010, which corresponds to an unemployment rate of 4.7 percent.

The number of agricultural enterprises in Aichtal has decreased from 285 in 1961 to 18 in 2007.

=== Resident companies ===
- Putzmeister, the leading manufacturer of concrete pumps with 15 subsidiaries worldwide, has been headquartered in Aichtal since 1971. With over 800 employees, the company is the largest employer in the city.
- Pago Labelling Systems, the German subsidiary of the Swiss Pago Group since 1978, produces in Aichtal not only labelling systems but also more than three billion self-adhesive labels for product decoration every year. Pago employs around 500 people in Aich.
- Aldi Aichtal is a regional subsidiary of the Aldi Süd retail chain, which includes around 70 branches between the northern Black Forest and the Eastern Alb. The branches are supplied from the central warehouse, built in 1976 and extended several times, which covers an area of 50,000 square metres.
- Today, the Kimmich sauerkraut factory is one of the last two of the former 17 companies that process the nationally known Filderkraut.

=== Media ===
The Nürtinger Zeitung reports about the events in Aichtal. Beside it the Stuttgarter Zeitung and the Stuttgarter Nachrichten are distributed with the local section for the district Esslingen. Since 1975 the municipal Mitteilungsblatt has been published weekly. Weekly advertising papers are the Filder-Extra and the Nürtinger Echo. From 1995 to 2010 the Aichtaler Echo appeared additionally.

=== Public institutions ===
The Aichtal Volunteer Fire Brigade is responsible for fire fighting and accident assistance in the city area. It consists of active departments in each of the three districts with a total of 10 emergency vehicles, a music department in Grötzingen and a youth fire brigade.

There are ten municipal kindergartens in Aichtal - five in Grötzingen, three in Aich, two in Neuenhaus - and additionally one Waldorf kindergarten in Grötzingen.

The youth and children's house is open daily for young people between six and 25 years. Outside there is a halfpipe, a volleyball court and a streetball court. Inside the house games such as billiards, table football, table tennis or darts are available as well as internet PCs. Regular events include discos, rock concerts and movie nights.

The municipal library Aichtal in the Grötzinger Helenenheim with a stock of 21.000 media is open to all citizens.

=== Education ===
In addition to the Grötzingen primary and secondary school with Werkrealschule, which offers all-day care, there are primary schools in Aich and Neuenhaus. Secondary schools are located in the neighbouring towns of Nürtingen and Filderstadt as well as in Neckartenzlingen. The Volkshochschule Nürtingen maintains a branch in Aichtal. In addition, the district of Neuenhaus was home to the Karl Schubert Seminar, an anthroposophical technical school for social work, where the theoretical part of the training to become a state-approved curative educator can be completed. Since 2011 the seminar is located in Wolfschlugen.

=== Supply and disposal ===
==== Power supply ====
Grötzingen has been supplied with electricity since 1910, Aich and Neuenhaus since 1912. Today, the electricity grid is operated by the EnBW.

==== Gas supply ====
A gas supply exists in the districts of Aich and Grötzingen, where a natural gas network is operated by EnBW.

==== Water supply ====
Aichtal is a member of the special purpose associations Filderwasserversorgung (Fiwa) and Lake Constance Water Supply (BWV). Grötzingen has been partially supplied with water from the River Neckar by the Fiwa since 1943 and completely since 1951, as has Aich since 1957. The water for Neuenhaus comes from the monks' own spring and since 1970 also from the BWV. The average daily per capita consumption is 121 litres.

==== Sewage disposal ====
The town operates a sewage treatment plant to the east of Grötzingen to treat the wastewater.

==== Waste disposal ====
Waste disposal is organized by the waste management company Esslingen, a company owned by the district of Esslingen.

== Personalities ==
=== Sons and daughters of the city ===
- Christoph Binder (1519-1596), Protestant clergyman, abbot of the Adelberg monastery
- Peter Maiwald (1946-2008), writer
- Angelika Matt-Heidecker (* 1953), lawyer and politician (SPD)
- Peter Bäuerle (* 1956 in Grötzingen district), chemist

=== Personalities who have worked locally ===
- Paul Maar (* 1937), the author of children's books lived for several years in the Grötzingen district.

== Literature ==
- Günter Klock (publisher): Aichtal in alten Ansichten. Europäische Bibliothek, Zaltbommel/Niederlande 1998, ISBN 90-288-6566-7.
- Günter Klock (publisher): Grötzingen – Einblicke in die Vergangenheit. Geiger, Horb 1987, ISBN 3-89264-160-9.
- Das Land Baden-Württemberg. Volume 3. Kohlhammer, Stuttgart 1978, ISBN 3-17-004758-2, p. 183–186.
- Orts-Chronik der Gemeinde Neuenhaus (Häfner-Neuhausen). Gemeindeverwaltung Neuenhaus 1973.
- Erich Keyser (publisher): Württembergisches Städtebuch. Kohlhammer, Stuttgart 1962, p. 101–102.
- Hans Schwenkel: Heimatbuch des Kreises Nürtingen. Volume II. Kreisverband Nürtingen 1953, p. 65–80/259–282/692–707.
- Otto Schuster: Heimatgeschichte der Stadt Grötzingen. Buchdruckerei Karl Henzler, Nürtingen 1929.
- Der Landkreis Esslingen – Hrsg. vom Landesarchiv Baden-Württemberg i. V. mit dem Landkreis Esslingen, Jan Thorbecke Verlag, Ostfildern 2009, ISBN 978-3-7995-0842-1, volume 1, p. 233–251.
- Bodo Cichy: Die Mauern von Grötzingen, Kreis Esslingen. Denkmalpflege in einer kleinen Stadtgemeinde. In: Denkmalpflege in Baden-Württemberg, 2. Jg. 1973, publication 3, p. 16–25. (PDF; 10,3 MB)
