= Esslingen (Landtag electoral district) =

State electoral district of Germany

7: Esslingen
- Electoral district for the Landtag of Baden-Württemberg
- Esslingen in 2026
- District: Esslingen
- Electorate: 112,378 (2026)
- Major settlements: Aichwald, Denkendorf, Esslingen am Neckar, Neuhausen auf den Fildern, Ostfildern, and Wolfschlugen

Current electoral district
- Party: CDU
- Member: Andreas Deuschle

Esslingen is an electoral constituency (German: Wahlkreis) represented in the Landtag of Baden-Württemberg. Since 2026, it has elected one member via first-past-the-post voting. Voters cast a second vote under which additional seats are allocated proportionally state-wide. Under the constituency numbering system, it is designated as constituency 7. It is wholly within the district of Esslingen.

== Geography ==
The constituency includes the municipalities of Aichwald, Denkendorf, Esslingen am Neckar, Neuhausen auf den Fildern, Ostfildern, and Wolfschlugen, within the district of Esslingen.

There were 112,378 eligible voters in 2026.

== Members ==
=== First mandate ===
Both prior to and since the electoral reforms for the 2026 election, the winner of the plurality of the vote (first-past-the-post) in every constituency won the first mandate.

Election	Member	Party	%
1976	Theo Balle	CDU	
1980	Theo Balle	CDU	
1984	Theo Balle	CDU	
1988	Martin Herzog	CDU	
Oct 1989	Christa Vossschulte	CDU	
1992	Christa Vossschulte	CDU	
1996	Christa Vossschulte	CDU	
2001	Christa Vossschulte	CDU	
2006	Christa Vossschulte	CDU	40.1
2011	Andreas Deuschle	CDU	36.5
2016	Andrea Lindlohr	Green	32.3
2021	Andrea Lindlohr	Green	35.7
2026	Andreas Deuschle	CDU	34.2

=== Second mandate ===
Prior to the electoral reforms for the 2026 election, the seats in the state parliament were allocated proportionately amongst parties which received more than 5% of valid votes across the state. The seats that were won proportionally for parties that did not win as many first mandates as seats they were entitled to, were allocated to their candidates which received the highest proportion of the vote in their respective constituencies. This meant that following some elections, a constituency would have one or more members elected under a second mandate.

Prior to 2011, these second mandates were allocated to the party candidates who got the greatest number of votes, whilst from 2011-2021, these were allocated according to percentage share of the vote.

Election	Member	Party	Member	Party
1976	Elisabeth Nill	SPD		
1980	Elisabeth Nill	SPD		
1984	Elisabeth Nill	SPD	Ernst Waldemar Bauer	FDP
1988	Wolfgang Drexler	SPD		
1992	Wolfgang Drexler	SPD		
1996	Wolfgang Drexler	SPD		
2001	Wolfgang Drexler	SPD		
2006	Wolfgang Drexler	SPD		
2011	Wolfgang Drexler	SPD	Andrea Lindlohr	Grüne
2016	Wolfgang Drexler	SPD	Andreas Deuschle	CDU
Jan 2019	Nicolas Fink	SPD		
2021	Nicolas Fink	SPD	Andreas Deuschle	CDU

== Election results ==
=== 2026 election ===
State election (2026): Esslingen
Notes:	Blue background denotes the winner of the electorate vote. Pink background denotes a candidate elected from their party list. Yellow background denotes an electorate win by a list member, or other incumbent. A ✓ or ✗ denotes status of any incumbent, win or lose respectively.						
Party	Candidate	Votes	%	±%	Party votes	%	±%
CDU	Andreas Deuschle	27,225	34.3	▲10.4	22,808	28.6	▲4.8
Greens	✗ Andrea Lindlohr	24,644	31.0	▼4.7	29,045	36.5	▲0.8
AfD	Stephan Köthe	11,103	14.0	▲6.8	10,835	13.6	▲6.4
SPD	Nicolas Fink	7,399	9.3	▼4.9	4,390	5.5	▼8.7
Left	Martin Auerbach	4,871	6.1	▲2.4	3,858	4.8	▲1.1
FDP	Tobias Wirth	2,873	3.6	▼5.8	3,574	4.5	▼4.9
FW					1,543	1.9	Steady
BSW					1,071	1.3	
Volt	Anita Marinović-Matičević	1,354	1.7		734	0.9	
APT					500	0.6	
PARTEI					312	0.4	▼0.8
dieBasis					188	0.2	▼0.5
Team Todenhöfer					180	0.2	
Bündnis C					126	0.2	
Values					121	0.2	
ÖDP					116	0.1	▼0.5
Pensioners					107	0.1	
PdF					52	0.1	
KlimalisteBW					41	0.1	▼0.8
Humanists					36	0.0	
Verjüngungsforschung					34	0.0	
Informal votes		631			429		
Total valid votes		79,469			79,671		
Turnout		80,100	71.3	▲5.6			
CDU gain from Greens	Majority	2,581	3.3				

=== 2021 election ===
State election (2026): Esslingen
Party	Candidate	Votes	%	±%
Greens	Andrea Lindlohr	25,904	35.7	▲3.4
CDU	Andreas Deuschle	17,297	23.8	▼2.2
SPD	Nicolas Fink	10,300	14.2	▼2.2
FDP	Ferdinand Kiesel	6,810	9.4	▲2.6
AfD	Klaus-Dieter Vogel	5,215	7.2	▼5.0
Left	Martin Auerbach	2,724	3.8	▲1.0
FW	Gordon-Yves Nothig	1,424	2.0	
PARTEI	Nicolai Gelbmann	857	1.2	▲0.5
KlimalisteBW	Anne Newball Duke	619	0.9	
dieBasis	Hans-Peter Tyrna	555	0.8	
ÖDP	Mathias Rady	473	0.7	▲0.2
WiR2020	Silvia Boss	460	0.6	
Majority		8,607	11.9	
Rejected ballots		349	0.5	▼0.2
Turnout		72,987	65.6	▼8.0
Registered electors		111,191		
Greens hold		Swing		

== See also ==
- Politics of Baden-Württemberg
- Landtag of Baden-Württemberg
