= Schaich =

River in Germany

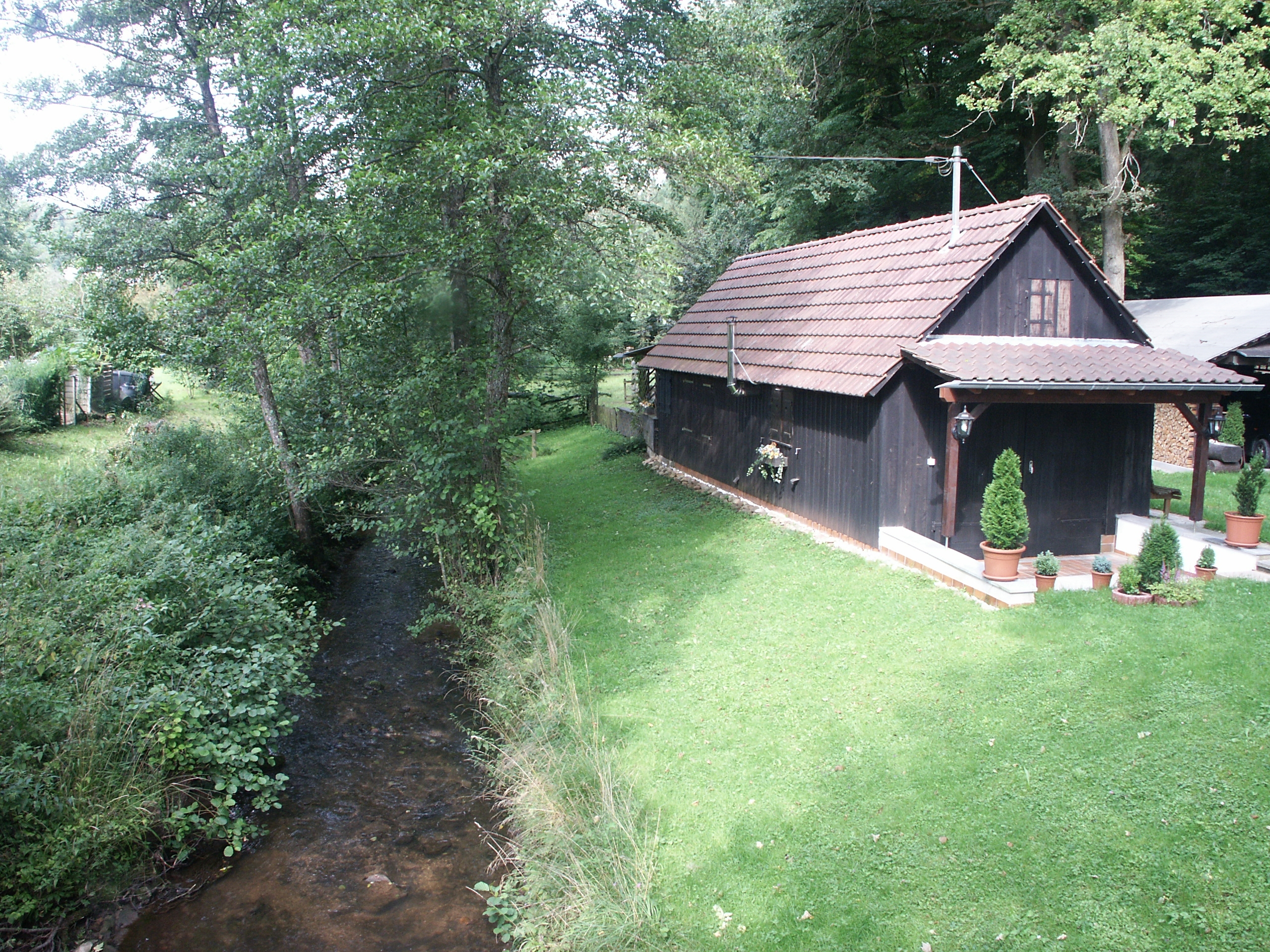

Location
- Country: Germany
- State: Baden-Württemberg

Physical characteristics
- Source
  - elevation: 544 m above sea level
- Mouth
  - location: Aich
  - coordinates: 48.6224°N 9.2150°E
  - elevation: 315.9 m above sea level
- Length: 23.6 km (14.7 mi)
- Basin size: 38.1 km²

Basin features
- Progression: Aich→ Neckar→ Rhine→ North Sea

Schaich is a river of Baden-Württemberg, Germany. It flows into the Aich near Neuenhaus.

== Geography ==
=== Course ===
The Schaich springs at about 544 m from the Hengstbrunnen in the forest south of Altdorf a little east of the Gabeleiche at the Rauhen Hau. Its headwaters lie in the north of the 582.6 m high Bromberg.

From there the river Schaich flows in mainly eastern direction through or at the edge of the areas of the municipalities Altdorf, Holzgerlingen, Weil im Schönbuch, Dettenhausen, Walddorfhäslach, Aichtal and Schlaitdorf. At the end of the district Neuenhaus of Aichtal it flows at an elevation of 315.9315.9 m southwest into Aich.

At the end of its 23.6 km long path with an average bottom gradient of 9.7 ‰ it flows about 228 meters altitude below its source.

The river Schaich flows in mainly eastern direction through the natural area Schönbuch, a mountainous forest area of the south German Keuperberglandes. It has its source at the northern edge of the southern Schönbuch, then moves along the southern edge of the Holzgerlinger Platte, the lower course crosses the northern Schönbuch.

At the beginning it runs approximately at the northern edge of the nature area Naturpark Schönbuch and later through its north-eastern part.

=== Catchment area ===
The Schaich drains an area of 38.1 km², which lies entirely within the Schönbuch natural area. Its highest point is the flat, 582.6 m high summit of the Bromberg south of the Hengstbrunnen, over which the southern watershed runs to the large catchment area of the Goldersbach and its tributaries, which drains over the Ammer to the Neckar. Further east, in the south, the catchment area of the Reichenbach, which flows into the Neckar at Pliezhausen, is bordered by the Reichenbach, then on this side by the continuously shorter Neckar tributaries.

On the northern side, from the mouth upwards only beyond Betzenberg only short tributaries compete with the Aich which takes the Schaich, in the area of the upper course then its partly very near tributary Seitenbach which also runs about east. Finally, north of the immediate source area of the Schaich, only about one kilometre away, the Altdorfer Würm, a branch of the Würm, which drains via the Nagold and the Enz only much further down than the Aich into the Neckar. The watershed, which is less prominent on this section than towards the south, is therefore hydrologically the most important.

=== Tributaries ===
Direct tributaries from the source to the estuary. Selection.
Stated lengths and catchment areas according to the official water map.

- Kreuzwiesenbach, from right near the domain Schaichhof of Holzgerlingen, 2,0 km and 1,8 km²
- Ramsbach, from right between Weil im Schönbuch and Dettenhausen, 2,4 km and 2,5 km²
- Fronlach, from the right in Dettenhausen, 2.9 km and 3.8 km²
- Weinhaldengraben, from left in Dettenhausen
- Sauwasengraben, from right to Dettenhausen
- (stream from the Hummelklinge), from the left, 0,8 km

== See also ==
- List of rivers of Baden-Württemberg
