= Aich (river) =

River in Germany

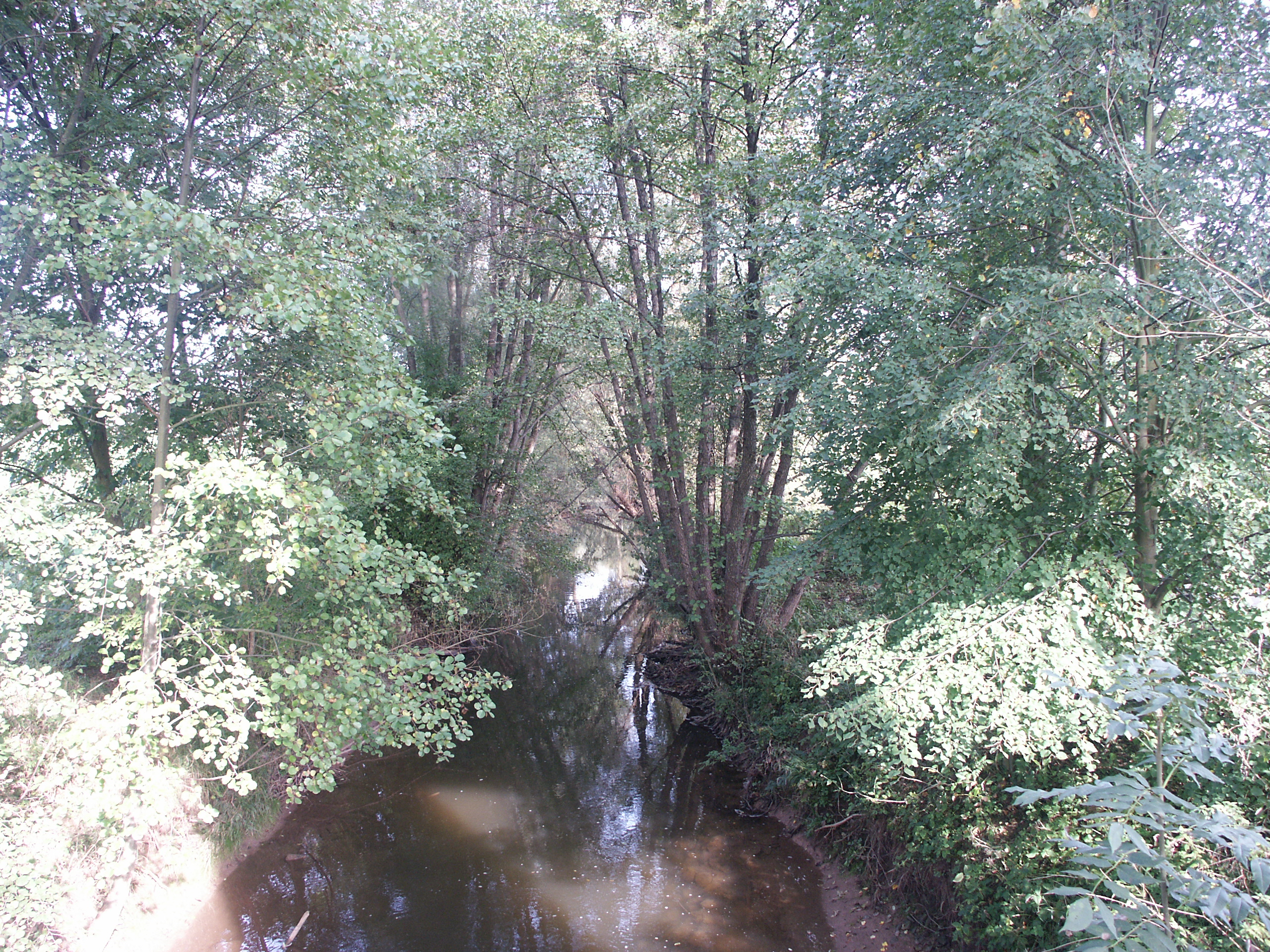
- The river flowing through Aichtal

- Location of mouth

Location
- Country: Germany
- State: Baden-Württemberg

Physical characteristics
- Source
  - location: Holzgerlingen
- Mouth
  - location: Neckar in Nürtingen
  - coordinates: 48.65°N 9.33°E
  - elevation: 268 metres (879 ft) above sea level
- Length: 30.5 km (19.0 mi)
- Basin size: 179 km^{2} (69 sq mi)

Basin features
- Progression: Neckar→ Rhine→ North Sea
- Tributaries
  - right: Schaich

The Aich is a river in Baden-Württemberg, Germany. It is approximately 30.5 kilometres (19.0 mi) long. It is a left tributary of the Neckar in Nürtingen.

== Geography ==
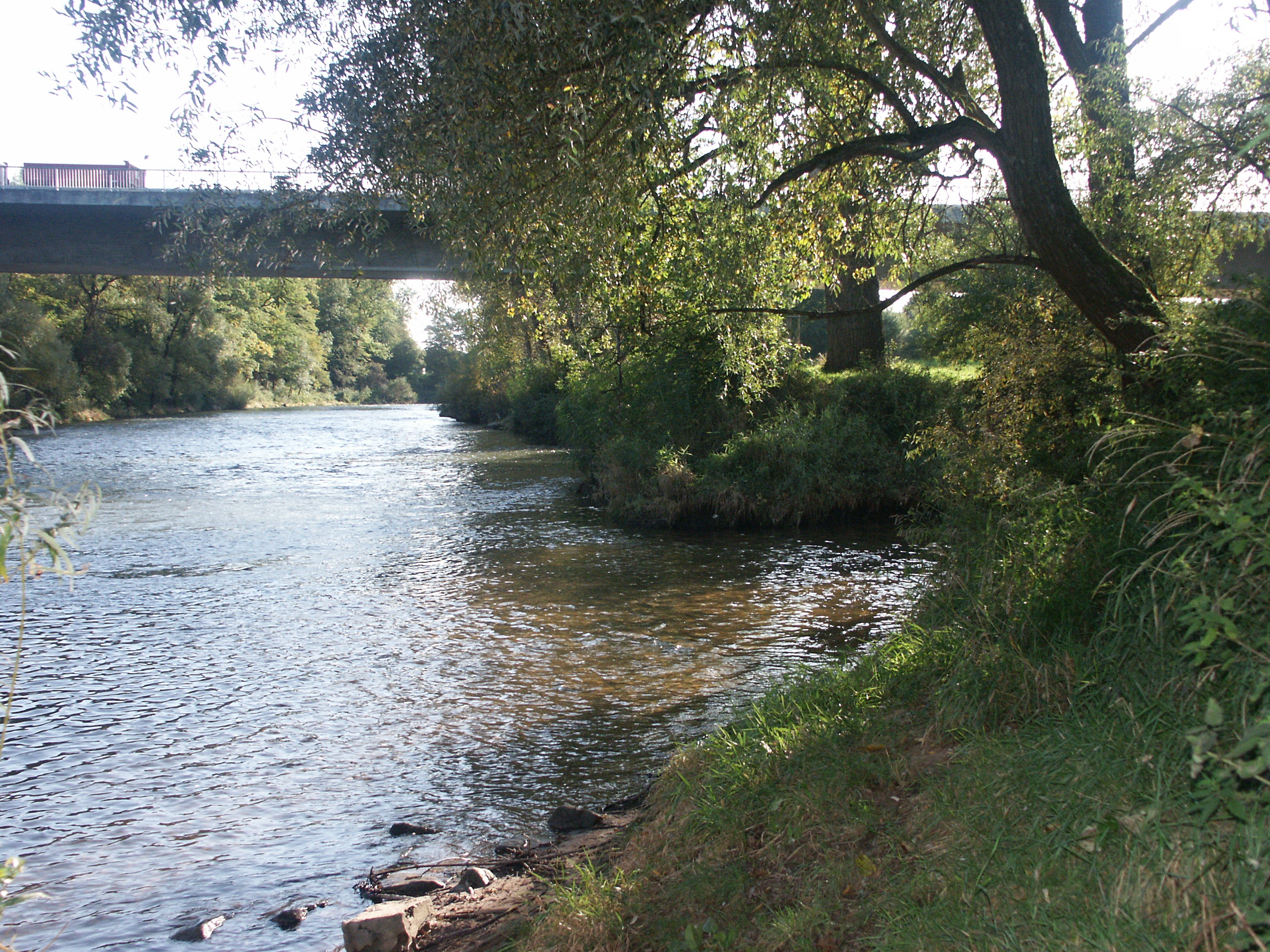
The Aich flowing into the Neckar

The Aich's origin is in Holzgerlingen. It flows to the north through Neuweiler and then south past Schönaich and Waldenbuch. It then flows through the Schönbuch nature park before passing through Betzenberg. After that, it flows through Aichtal before finally passing through Oberensingen and into the Neckar. The river is home to some species of white fish.

=== Tributaries ===
- Eschelbach (right), 2,2 km, 1,8 km^{2}
- Aischbach (right), 3,1 km, 2,8 km^{2}
- Keckbach (right), 1,6 km, 1,9 km^{2}
- Krähenbach (left), 4,8 km, 8,1 km^{2}
- Kohlklingenbach (right), 0,4 km
- Seebach (left), 2,1 km, 1,9 km^{2}
- Losklinge (left), 1,6 km
- Seebach (left), 6,9 km, 14,8 km^{2}
- Laubbach (right), 1,6 km
- Faulbach (right), 3,0 km
- Erbeerbühl(bach) (left), 1,4 km
- Groppbach (left), 1,7 km
- Seitenbach (right), 9,4 km
- Immenbach (right), 2,97 km
- Brunnenbach (right), 1,7 km
- Diebsklinge (right), 1,6 km
- Stellenbrunnen (right), 0,95 km
- Reichenbach (left), 13,3 km
- Schaich (right), 23,6 km
- Baumbach (left), 7,5 km
- Baiersbach (right), 2,07 km
- Finsterbach (left), 2,3 km
- Weiherbach (left), 4,4 km
- Follbach (left'), 3,5 km
- Teufelsklinge (left), 0,7 km

== See also ==
- List of rivers of Baden-Württemberg
