= Altes Theater =

Altes Theater may refer to:

- Altes Theater (Leipzig)
- Altes Theater (Düsseldorf)
- Altes Theater (Heilbronn)
