= Nicolas Fink (politician) =

German politician (born 1976)

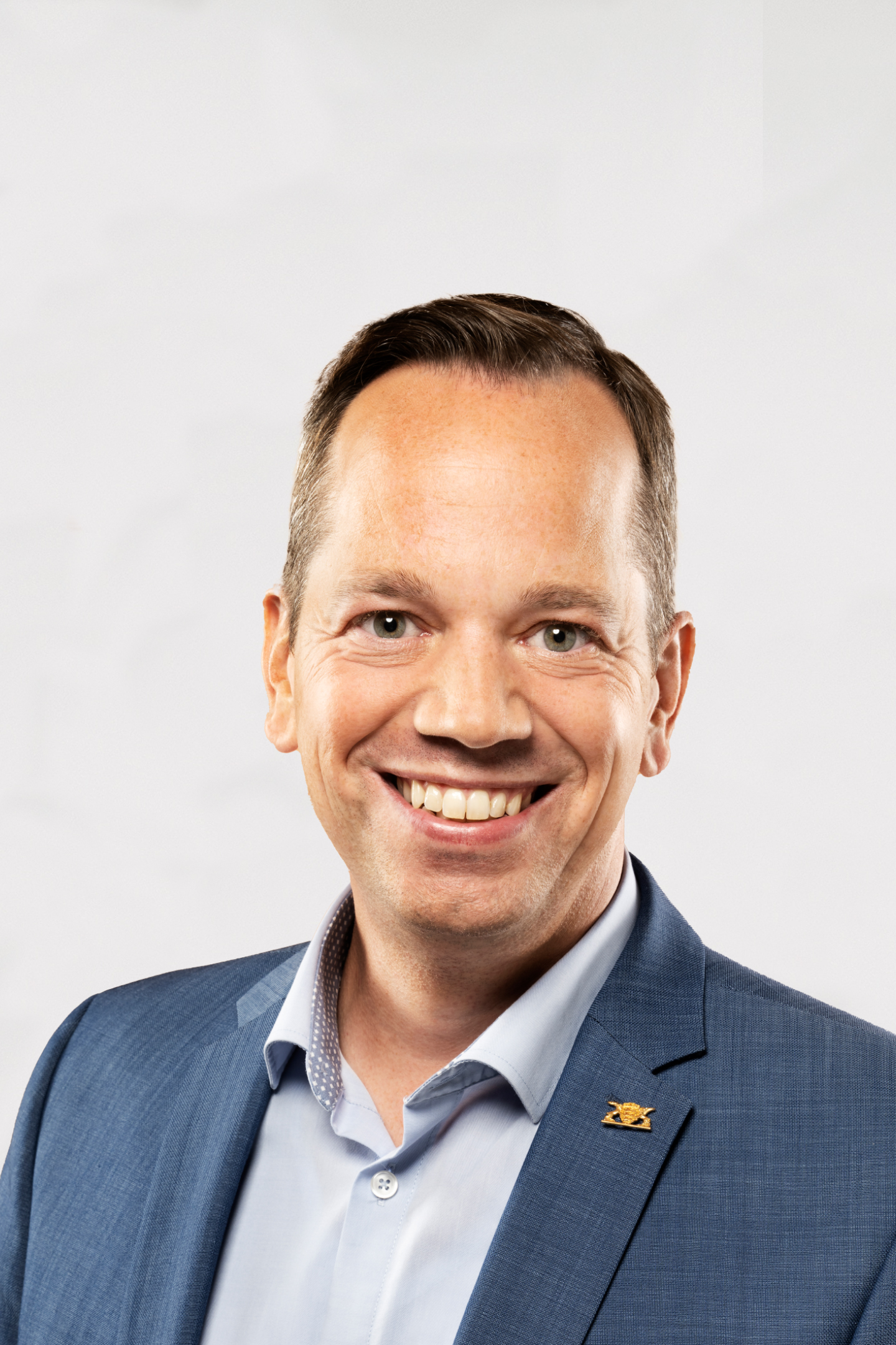
- Fink in 2021

Member of the Landtag of Baden-Württemberg
- Incumbent
- Assumed office 1 January 2019
- Preceded by: Wolfgang Drexler
- Constituency: Esslingen

Personal details
- Born: 8 September 1976 (age 49)
- Party: Social Democratic Party (since 1999)

Nicolas Fink (born 8 September 1976) is a German politician serving as a member of the Landtag of Baden-Württemberg since 2019. From 2006 to 2018, he served as mayor of Aichwald.
