= Theater am Olgaeck =

Coordinates: 48°46′25″N 9°11′12″E

Theater am Olgaeck is a theatre in Stuttgart, Baden-Württemberg, Germany. It lies in the city centre on Charlottenstraße 44.

The theatre was founded in 2004 by Nelly Eichhorn. The theatre also hosts films, concerts, readings and foreign-language events. The theatre has partnerships with numerous Eastern European countries, including Russia, Poland and Romania.
