= Theater im Marienbad =

Theatre in Baden-Württemberg, Germany

Theater im Marienbad is a theatre in Baden-Württemberg, Germany.

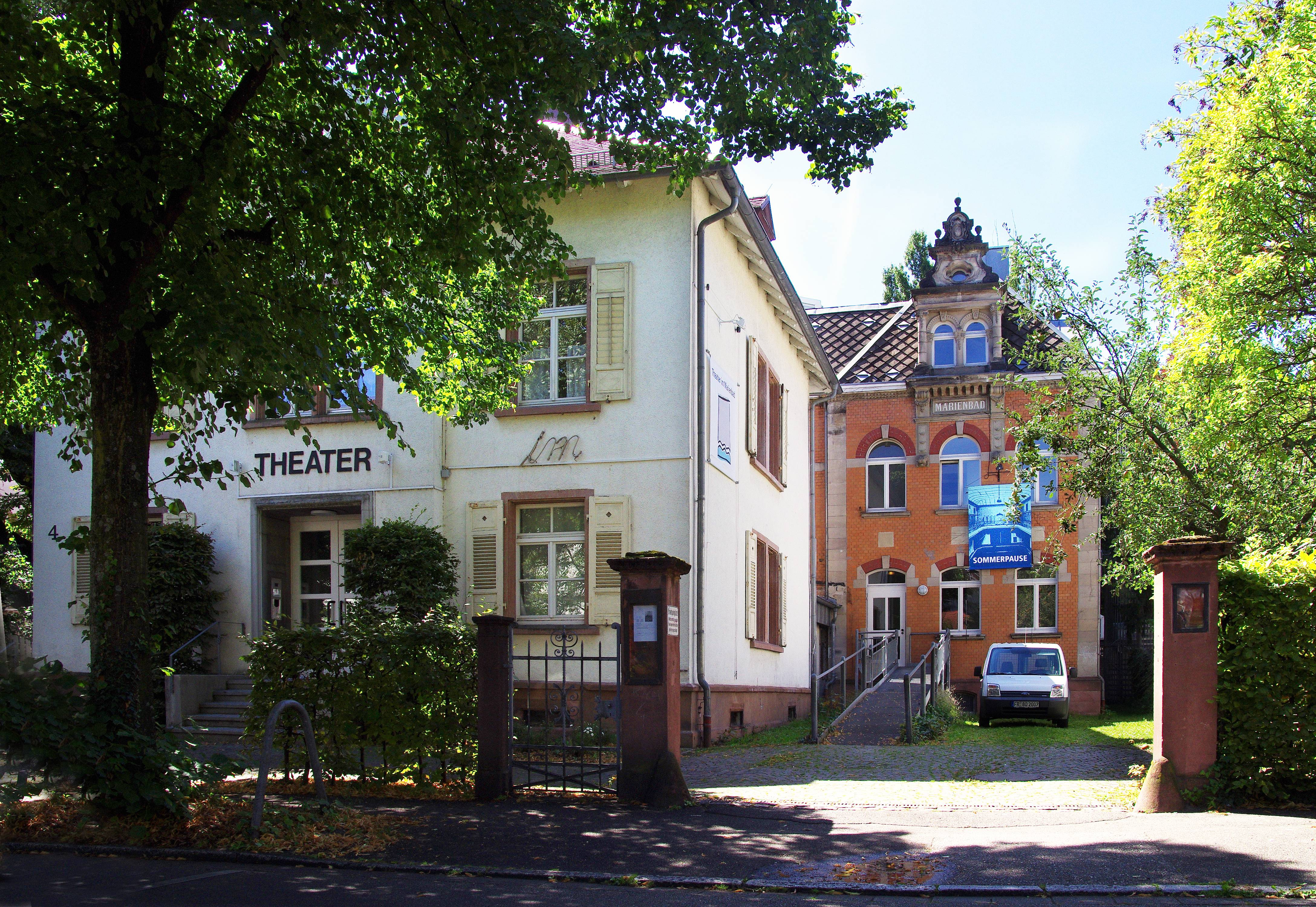
Shown is the theater.

The Theater im Marienbad, which is located in the former town baths of Freiburg, is used as a venue for theatre plays.

Since 1989, it has been continuously used by the children's and youth theatre group. Depending on the stage construction, the great hall offers space for approximately 250 guests, the Kesselhaus for approximately 80 guests.

The children's and youth theatre of Freiburg, an Ensembletheater, consists of 13 members, of which 8 are actors. Besides theatre performances they also focus on theatre pedagogy. The performances which include intimate narrative theatre, well-known classic plays as well as further actings, do not only address young people but also adults.

Essential parts of theatre pedagogy are preparation and evaluation tutorials with pupils, but also further educations for teachers.
