= Freilichtbühne Ötigheim =

Theatre in Ötigheim, Baden-Württemberg, Germany

Coordinates: 48°53′02″N 8°13′55″E

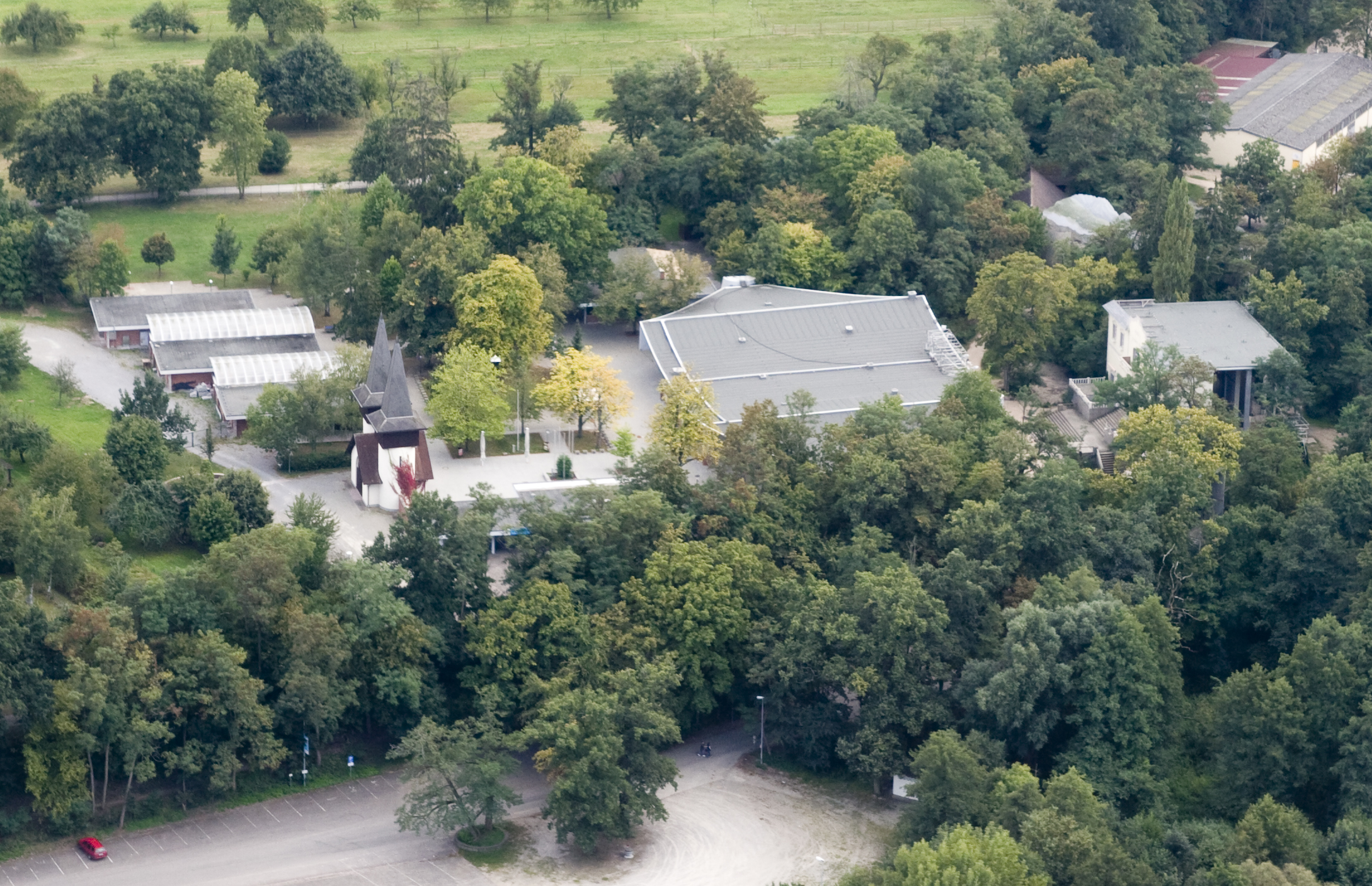
Freilichtbühne Ötigheim open-air theatre (Germany)

Freilichtbühne Ötigheim is an open-air theatre in Ötigheim, Baden-Württemberg, Germany.
