= TiG7 =

Theatre in Mannheim, Germany

Coordinates: 49°29′32″N 8°27′39″E

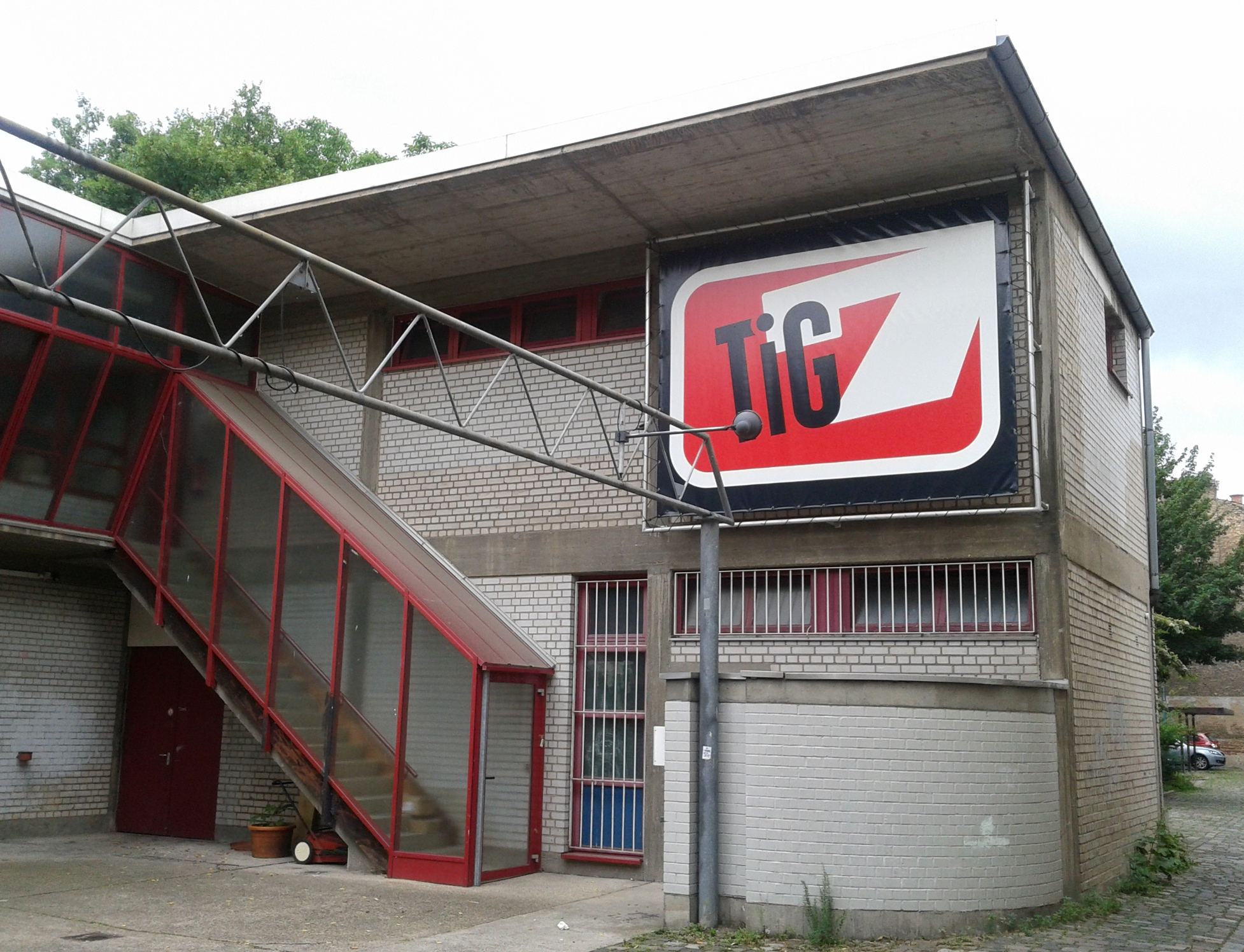
An image of TiG7

TiG7 is a theatre in Mannheim, Baden-Württemberg, Germany.]
