= Naturtheater Hayingen =

Open-air theatre in Hayingen, Germany

Coordinates: 48°16′50″N 9°29′11″E

Naturtheater Hayingen is a theatre in Hayingen, Baden-Württemberg, Germany.
