= Theater der Stadt Aalen =

Theatre company in Baden-Württemberg, Germany

Theater der Stadt Aalen is a theatre in Aalen, Baden-Württemberg, Germany, founded in 1991. Each year it stages around 500 performances, with a small permanent ensemble and varying guest companies. Contemporary drama is heavily featured alongside classics, plays for younger audiences, vocal performances and readings.

Tonio Kleinknecht has managed the theatre since 2013, aided by lead dramatist Tina Brüggemann and Winfried Tobias, head of youth and children's theatre.
