= Renitenztheater =

Theatre in Stuttgart, Baden-Württemberg, Germany

Coordinates: 48.7781505°N 9.1732889°E

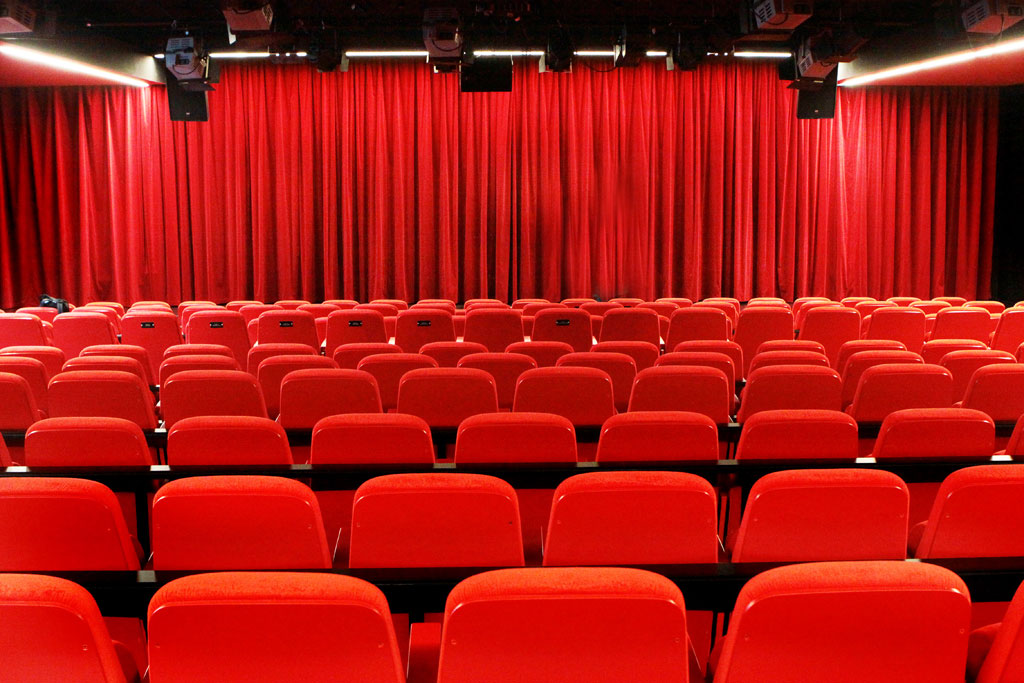

Renitenztheater is a theatre in Stuttgart, Baden-Württemberg, Germany. Most events consist of guest appearances by comedians and singers. In addition, each year it features a satirical play produced by the theater itself. One of the annual highlights of the theater is the "German-Turkish cabaret week."
