= Harrys Depot =

Theatre in Baden-Württemberg, Germany

Coordinates: 47°59′40″N 7°50′27″E

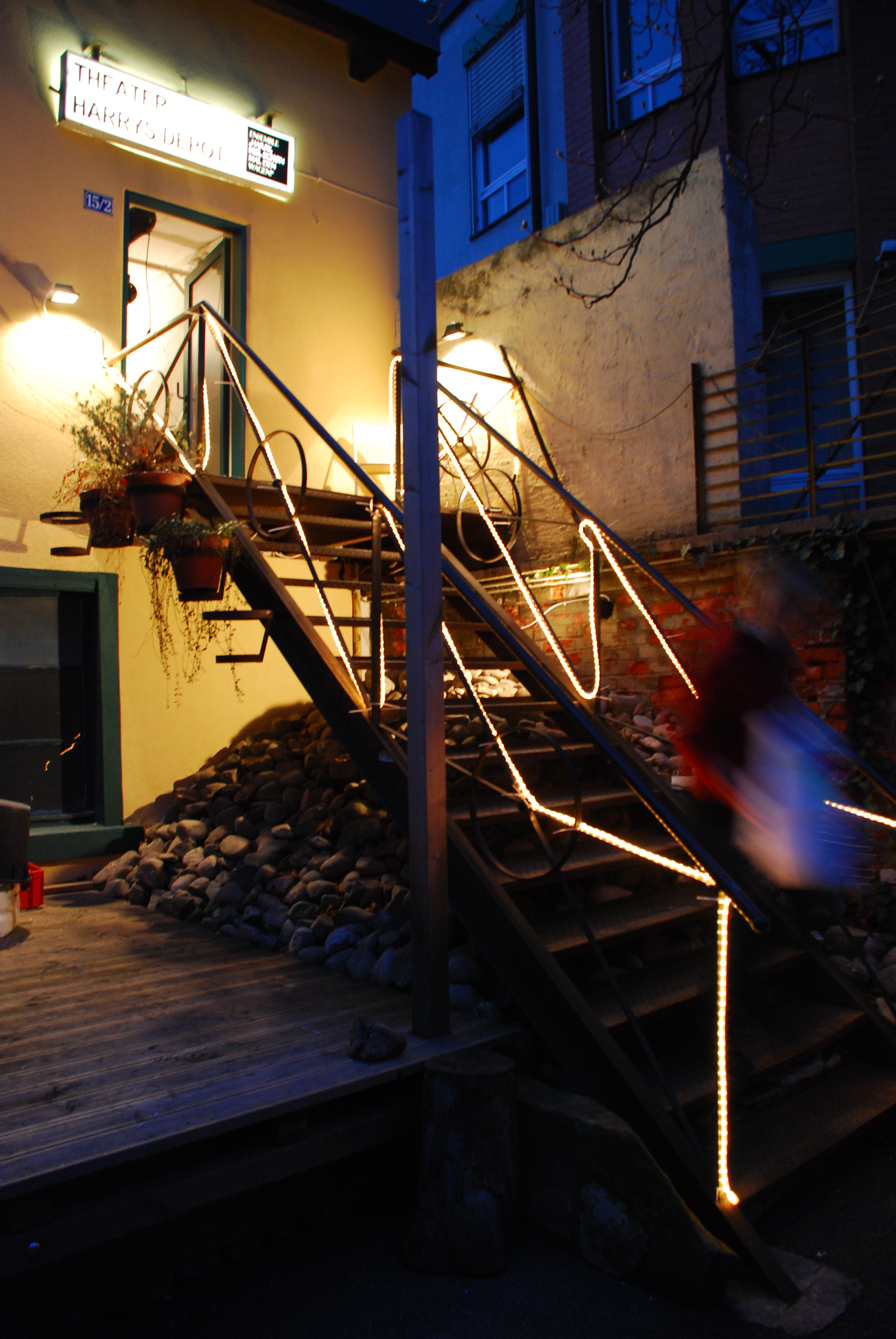
Entrance of Harrys Depot

Harrys Depot is a theatre in Freiburg im Breisgau in Baden-Württemberg, Germany.
