= Volkstheater (Stuttgart) =

Volkstheater is a privately operated theater in Stuttgart, Baden-Württemberg, Germany. It was founded in 1945 (according to other sources, 1946) and closed in 1948.
