= Schlosstheater Ludwigsburg =

Theater of Ludwigsburg Palace in Ludwigsburg, Germany

Coordinates: 48°53′52″N 9°11′46″E

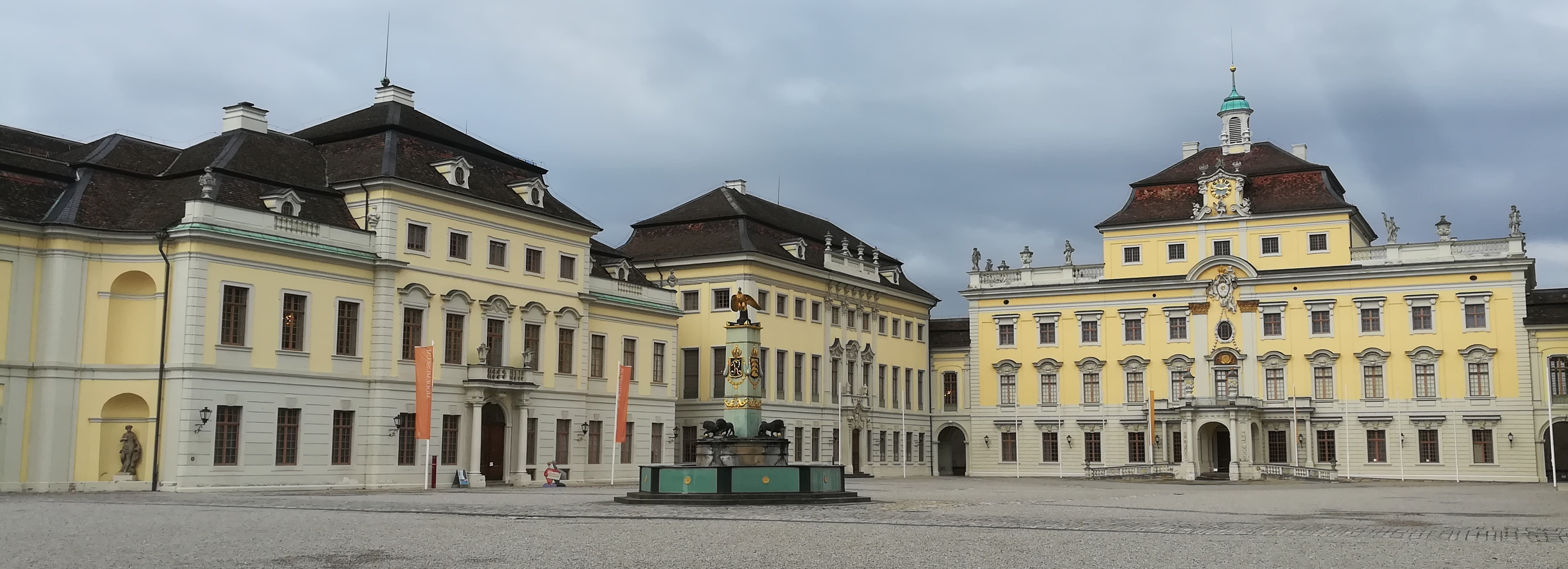
Ludwigsburg Palace December 2018

Schlosstheater Ludwigsburg is a theatre in Ludwigsburg, Baden-Württemberg, Germany.
