= Klapsmühl' am Rathaus =

Cabaret theatre in Mannheim, Baden, Germany

Coordinates: 49°29′21″N 8°27′42″E

Klapsmühl' am Rathaus is a cabaret theatre in Mannheim, Baden-Württemberg, Germany.

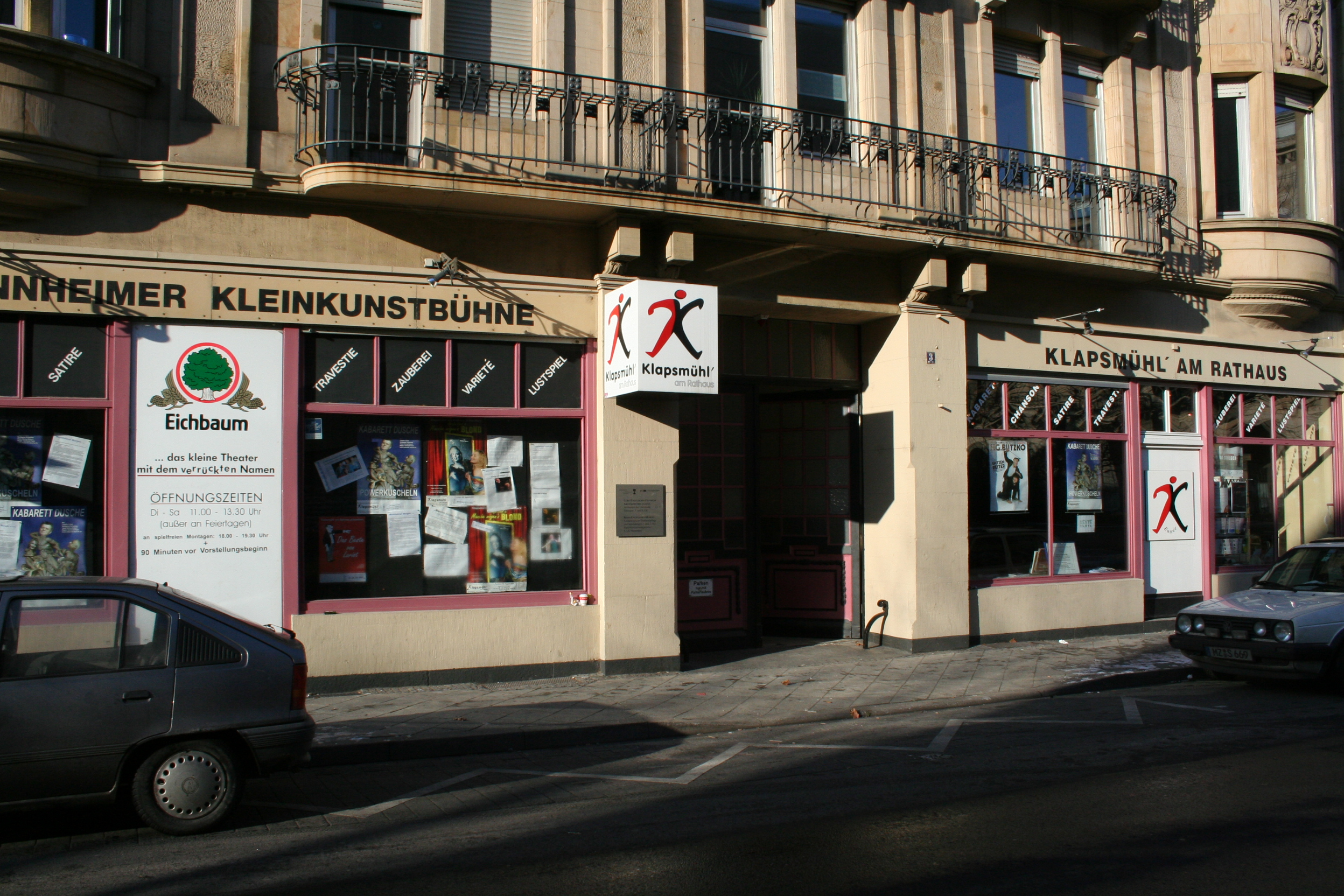
An image of Klapsmühl' am Rathaus
