= Theater tri-bühne =

Theatre in Stuttgart, Bade-Württemberg, Germany

Coordinates: 48°46′22″N 9°10′35″E

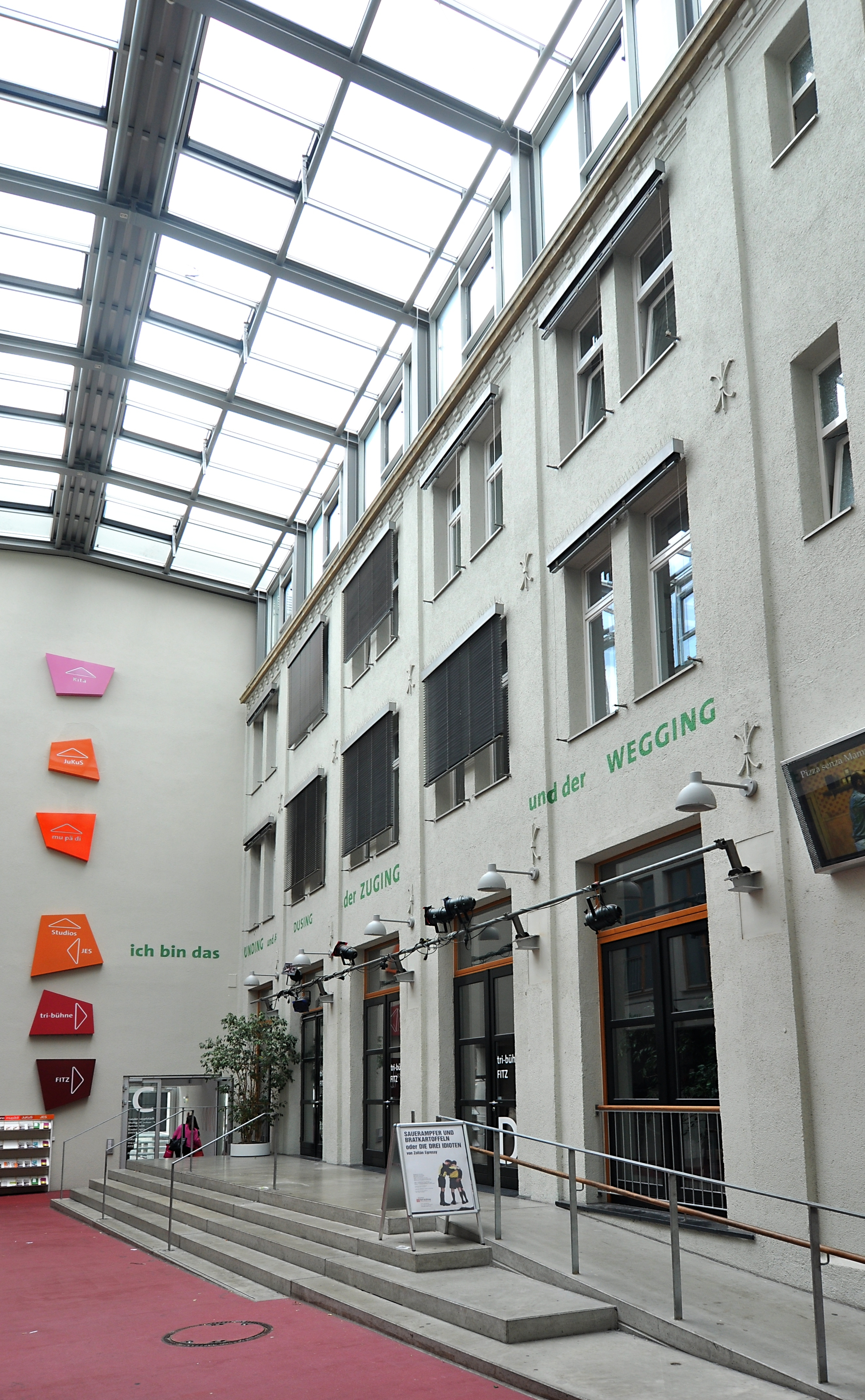
An image of Theater tri-bühne

Theater tri-bühne is a theatre in Stuttgart, Baden-Württemberg, Germany.
