= Freilichtspiele Neuenstadt =

Coordinates: 49°14′15″N 9°19′51″E

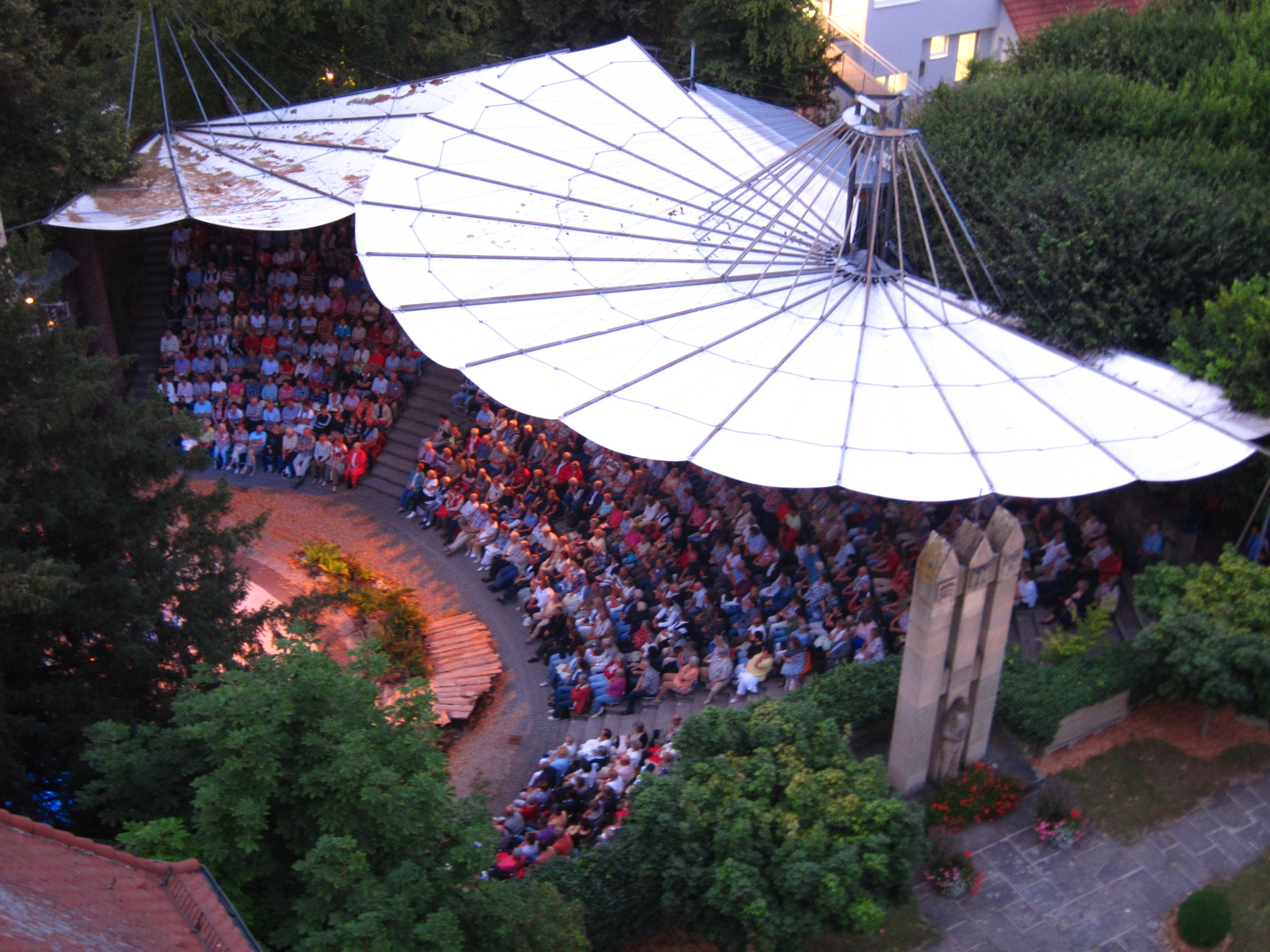
Stage in the castle moat of the Neuenstadt open-air theatre.

Freilichtspiele Neuenstadt is a theatre in Neuenstadt am Kocher, Baden-Württemberg, Germany. It claims to have put on 1,218 performances for 844,535 visitors between 1958 and 2018.

== History ==
After Neuenstadt am Kocher was 80% destroyed during the Second World War, plans were made to fill the castle moat with rubble from the reconstruction work. However, thanks to two local residents, Willi Carl and Emil Ermold, this did not happen. Together with engineer Eugen Kreß, they instead planned a ceremonial site next to the historic linden grove. With the help of members of the Liederkranz choir, thousands of hours of volunteer labor were invested in creating a circular stage with ascending rows of seats, resembling an amphitheater. The venue was inaugurated in 1951 during a singing festival organized by Liederkranz Neuenstadt.
