= BAAL novo =

Coordinates: 48.495169°N 7.784705°E

BAAL novo (now known as The Theatre Eurodistrict BAden ALsace since 2019) is a theatre in Offenburg, Baden-Württemberg, Germany. The theatre was established in 2005 as a cross-border theatre. It holds the distinction of being the only bi-national theatre in Europe and is supported by a French association located in Strasbourg and a German association in Offenburg. As the theatre of the Eurodistrict Strasbourg-Ortenau, BAAL services the entire German-French border region. It also stands as the sole professional ensemble theatre within the Ortenau district, operating under the designation of a regional theatre.

Initially, BAAL novo made a name for itself on the stages of regional theatres, until 2019, when it opened its own theatre venue, designed by architect and investor Jürgen Grossmann.

Director Edzard Schoppmann leads a team of ten individuals who oversee the areas of direction, set and costume design, theatre education, management, administration, project and school management, public relations, and event technology for the company. The BAAL ensemble consists of approximately thirty regular performers. The theatre company produces three to four new plays each year, catering to audiences of children, young adults, and adults. Additionally, the Eurodistrict Theatre, in collaboration with members of the local community, stages a socio-cultural project once a year.

At the beginning of 2023, the theatre hosted its first cross-border children's and youth theater festival called "Allez hop!".
