= Denkendorf =

Denkendorf may refer to two municipalities in Germany:

- Denkendorf, Baden-Württemberg
- Denkendorf, Bavaria
