= Naturtheater Grötzingen =

Coordinates: 48°37′20″N 9°15′58″E

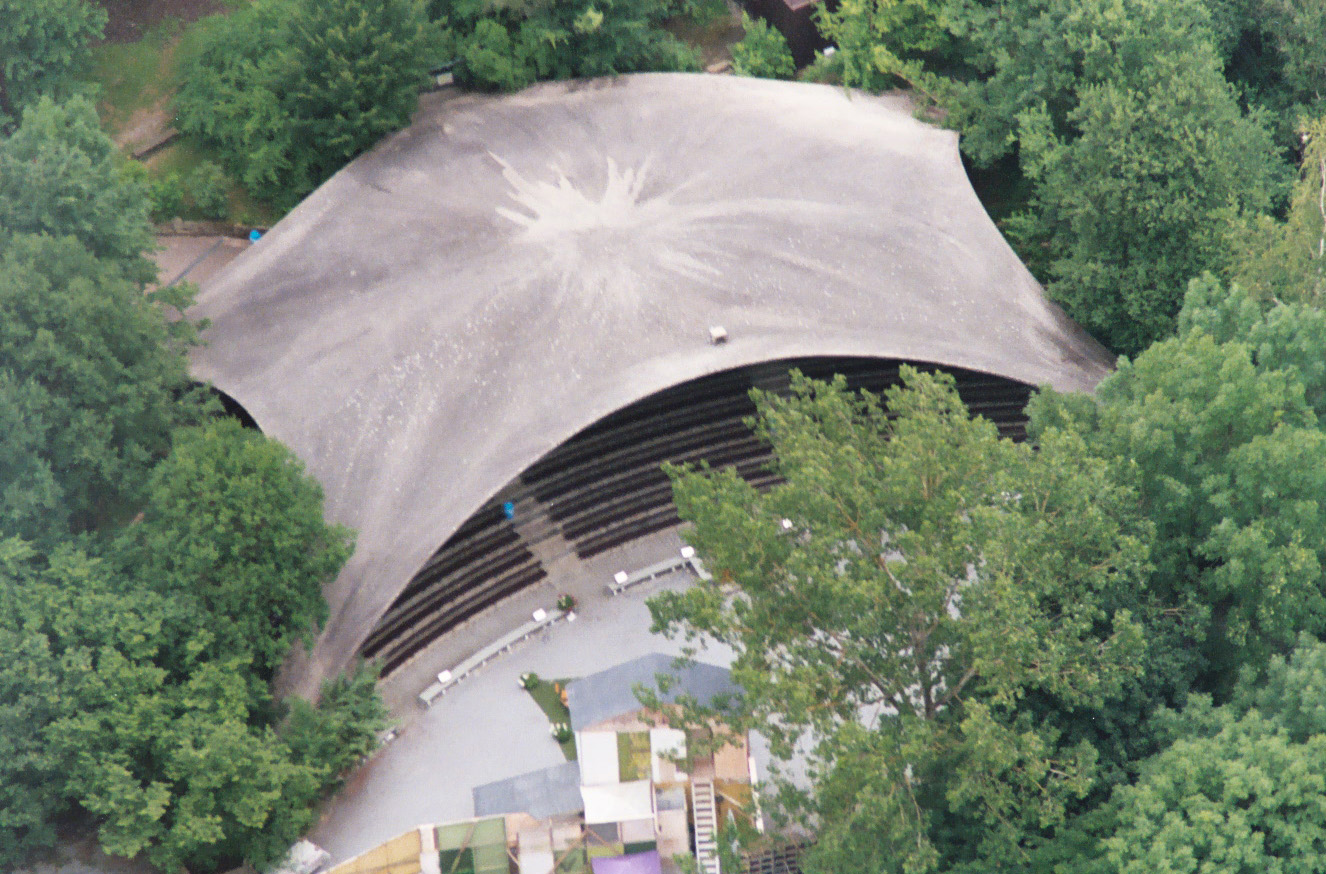
Naturtheater Grötzingen

Naturtheater Grötzingen is a sylvan theatre in Grötzingen, Baden-Württemberg, Germany. It is a thin concrete shell built in 1954 and seats an audience of 850. It was designed by architect Michael Balz and structural engineer Heinz Isler.
