= Walddorfhäslach =

- Municipality
- Coat of arms

- Location of Walddorfhäslach within Reutlingen district
- Interactive map of Walddorfhäslach
- Location within Germany Location within Baden-Württemberg
- Coordinates: 48°35′20″N 09°10′52″E
- Country: Germany
- State: Baden-Württemberg
- Admin. region: Tübingen
- District: Reutlingen
- Subdivisions: 2 Ortstteile

Government
  - Mayor (2020–28): Silke Höflinger

Area
  - Total: 14.44 km^{2} (5.58 sq mi)
- Elevation: 440 m (1,440 ft)

Population (2025-12-31)
  - Total: 5,445
  - Density: 377.1/km^{2} (976.6/sq mi)
- Time zone: UTC+01:00 (CET)
  - Summer (DST): UTC+02:00 (CEST)
- Postal codes: 72141
- Dialling codes: 07127
- Vehicle registration: RT
- Website: www.walddorfhaeslach.de

Walddorfhäslach is a town in the district of Reutlingen in Baden-Württemberg in Germany.

== History ==
=== Overview ===
The municipality of Walddorfhäslach was created on April 1, 1972, through the merger of the formerly independent municipalities of Walddorf and Häslach, which at the time belonged to the district of Tübingen. As part of the district reform, Walddorfhäslach was incorporated into the district of Reutlingen in 1973.

The district of Walddorf was first mentioned in a document by Pope Innocent III as Waltdorf. Walddorf probably originated as a settlement in the 7th or 8th century, as indicated by the suffix -dorf in the place name. The discovery of three dead trees on the west side of the church in 1866 made this assumption more likely.

The district of Walddorf has been authorized to hold fairs since the first quarter of the 18th century at the latest, making it a market town. With the support of the bailiff of Tübingen, a corresponding application was submitted to the Duke of Württemberg in 1707. As the central town of the so-called Unteramt at the time, it was believed that it was entitled to do so. Only the responsible official town of Tübingen objected vehemently. The oldest written evidence of the Trinitatis fair dates back to 1723. At present, four markets are usually held each year. The markets take place in the main street around the Walddorf town hall.

The name Haselach dates back to 1310. For a long time, the actual name document was unknown and people had to rely on the information in the work "Das Königreich Württemberg. Eine Beschreibung nach Kreisen, Oberämtern und Gemeinden", Stuttgart 1904-1907 (Volume II, page 582), whose authors failed to cite a source. The document was only found in the Reutlingen town archives shortly before Häslach's 700th anniversary in 2010.

Today, it is generally assumed that the place name can be traced back to an earlier place name, according to which Häslach was the "settlement by a stream at Haselgebüsch". The compound is derived from the word parts Häsl for hazel (hazel bush) and Ach, an Old High German word for stream, which also occurs in other town names, such as Bacharach, Laufach.
