= Wolfschlugen =

- Municipality
- Coat of arms

- Location of Wolfschlugen within Esslingen district
- Interactive map of Wolfschlugen
- Location within Germany Location within Baden-Württemberg
- Coordinates: 48°39′N 9°17′E
- Country: Germany
- State: Baden-Württemberg
- Admin. region: Stuttgart
- District: Esslingen

Government
  - Mayor (2018–26): Matthias Ruckh

Area
  - Total: 7.12 km^{2} (2.75 sq mi)
- Elevation: 371 m (1,217 ft)

Population (2025-12-31)
  - Total: 6,224
  - Density: 874/km^{2} (2,260/sq mi)
- Time zone: UTC+01:00 (CET)
  - Summer (DST): UTC+02:00 (CEST)
- Postal codes: 72649
- Dialling codes: 07022
- Vehicle registration: ES, NT
- Website: wolfschlugen.de

Wolfschlugen is a town in the district of Esslingen in the Filder Plain in Baden-Württemberg in southern Germany.

== History ==
Wolfschlugen was first mentioned in documents on April 2, 1318 when a local named Benz from Kirchheim unter Teck sold some products of his farm in Wolfschlugen. It is however commonly assumed that people have settled there long before. A strong indication is provided by the close presence of the Waldhauser Schloss, an old Latin estate in a forest nearby Wolfschlugen.

- 1380 the town became official by a declaration of Eberhard II, Count of Württemberg.
- 1603 the Protestant church was reconstructed and obtained the shape which still can be seen today.
- 1608/09 construction of the town hall by the builders Michel Knell and Jerg Mercklin.
- 1776 construction of the first school.
- 1866 foundation of the voluntary fire department.
- 1899 first telegraph office.
- 1903 foundation of the music society.
- 1906 first telephone connection.
- 1914 first electrical lights on the streets.
- 1938 Wolfschlugen became a member of the district of Nürtingen.
- 1970 dedication of the festival hall and the sports field.
- 1973 the district of Nürtingen ceased to exist and the municipality Wolfschlugen was absorbed into the district of Esslingen.
- 1993 dedication of the new sports hall.

== Demographics ==
=== Number of residents ===
The numbers of inhabitants are census results (¹) or official data from statistical office, Stuttgart.

Date	Number of residents
3. December 1834 ¹	1.206
1. December 1871 ¹	1.281
1. December 1900 ¹	1.407
17. May 1939 ¹	1.762
13. September 1950 ¹	2.239
6. June 1961 ¹	2.689
27. May 1970 ¹	3.547
25. May 1987 ¹	5.212
31. December 1995	5.710
31. December 2000	6.082
31. December 2005	6.264
31. December 2010	6.309
31. December 2015	6.340
