= Altes Theater (Heilbronn) =

Coordinates: 49°08′44″N 9°13′23″E

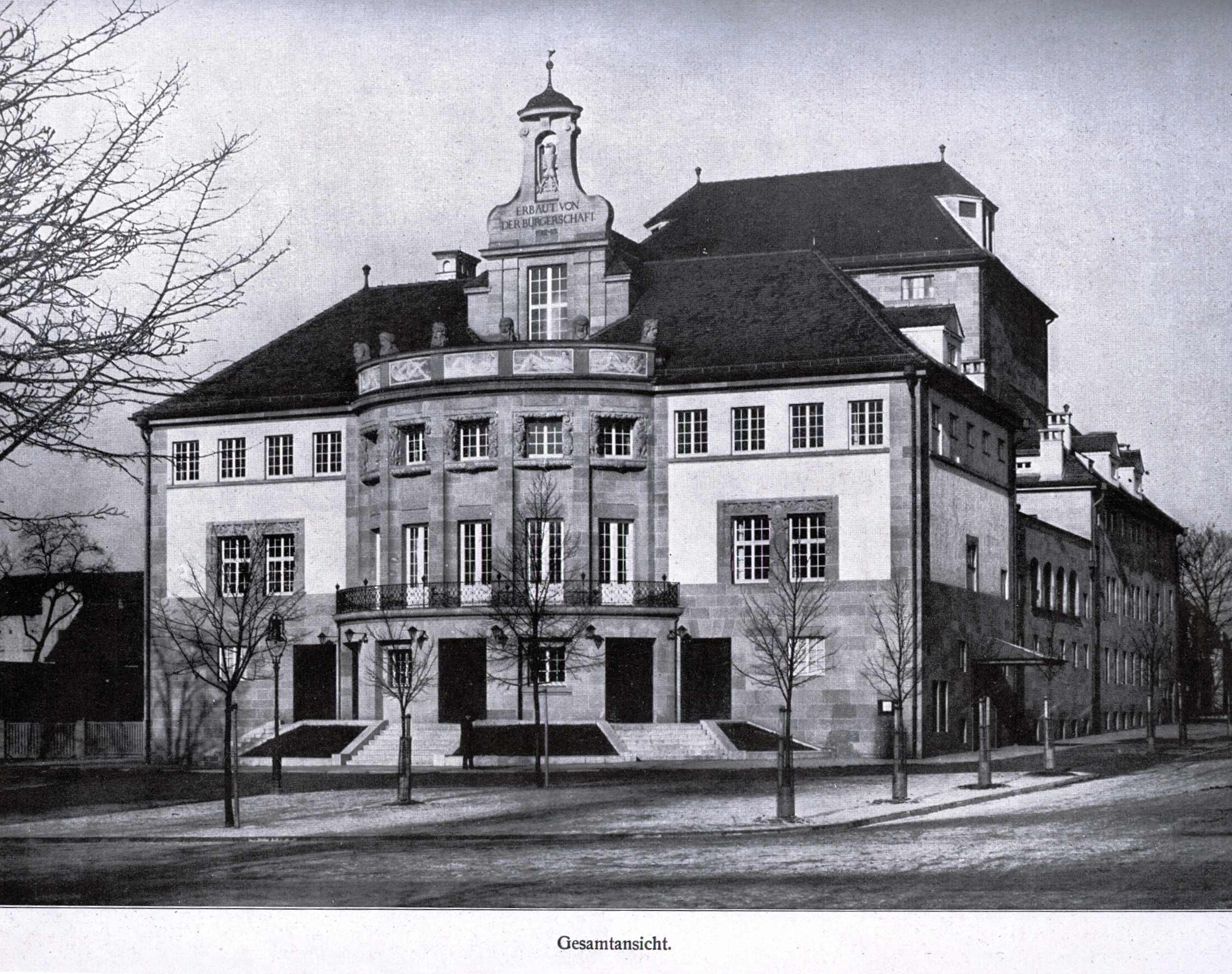
Altes Theater, eastern face

Altes Theater is a theatre in Heilbronn, Baden-Württemberg, Germany.
