= Betzenberg (Schönbuch) =

Coordinates: 48°37′N 9°10′E

Highest point
- Elevation: 499.5 m (1,639 ft)

Geography
- Location: Baden-Württemberg, Germany

Betzenberg (Schönbuch) is a mountain in Baden-Württemberg, Germany.

== See also ==
- List of hills of the Schönbuch
