= List of hills of the Schönbuch =

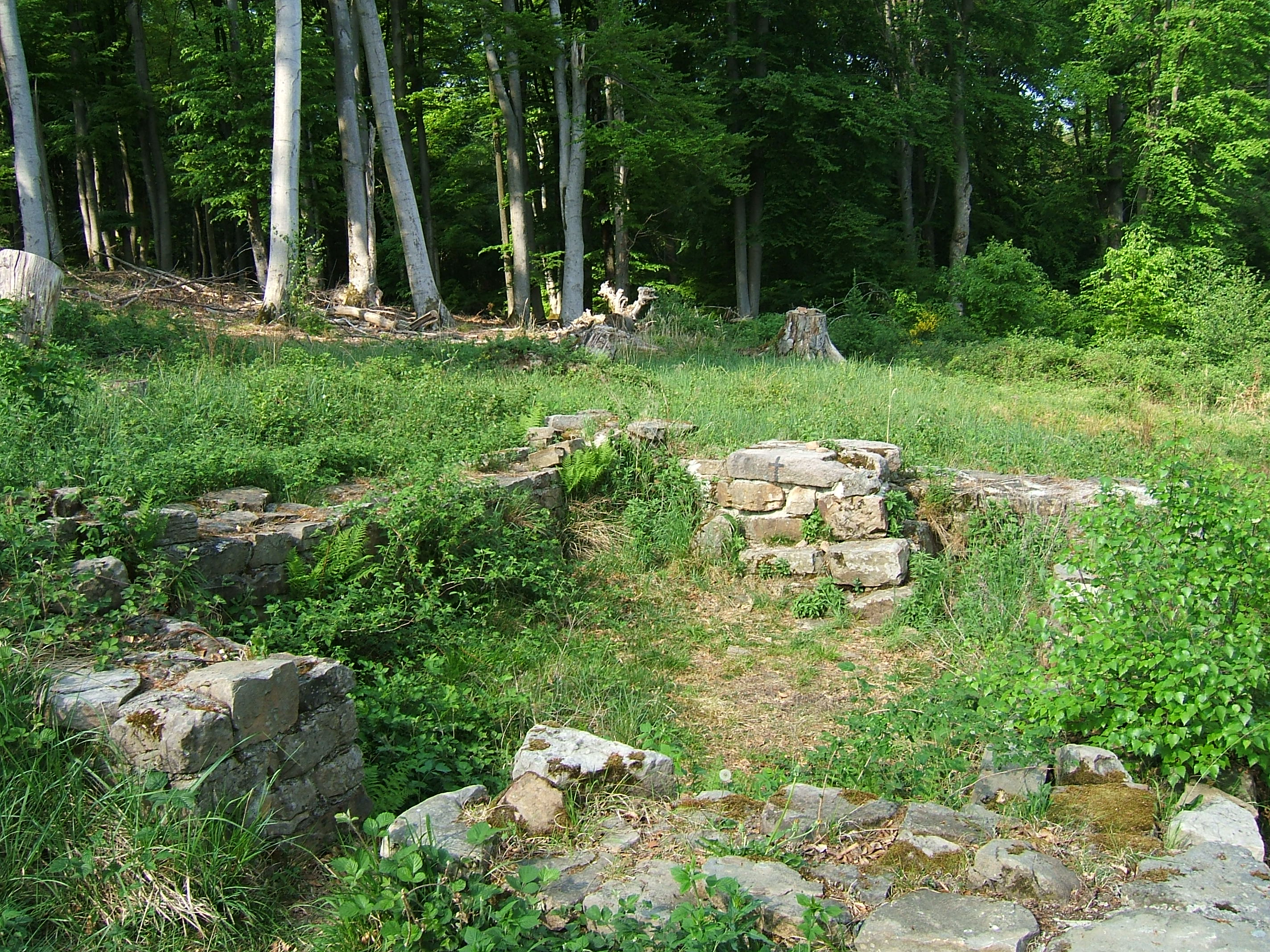
Chapel of the hermitage on the Bromberg with altar

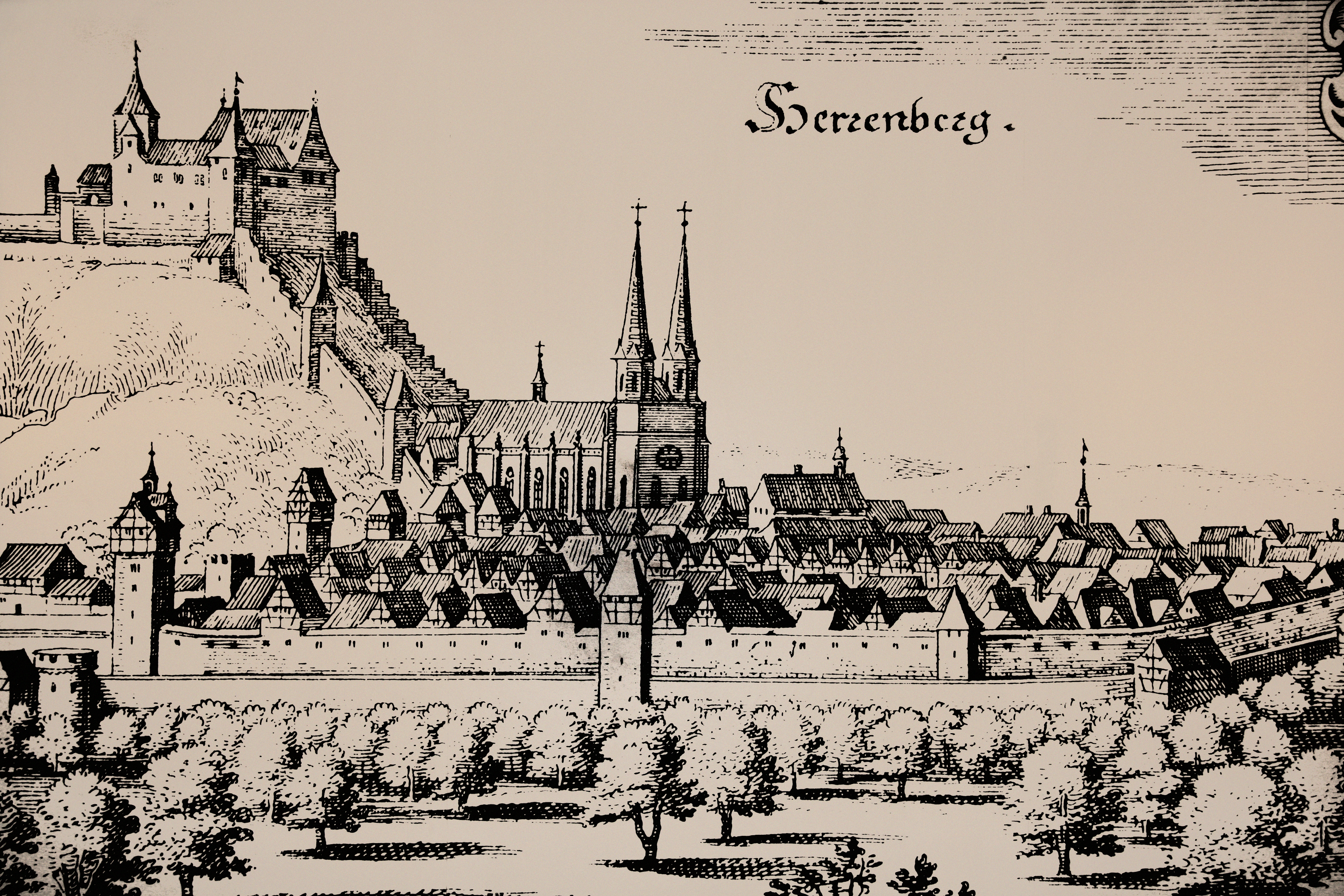
Herrenberg Palace (Schlossberg Herrenberg)

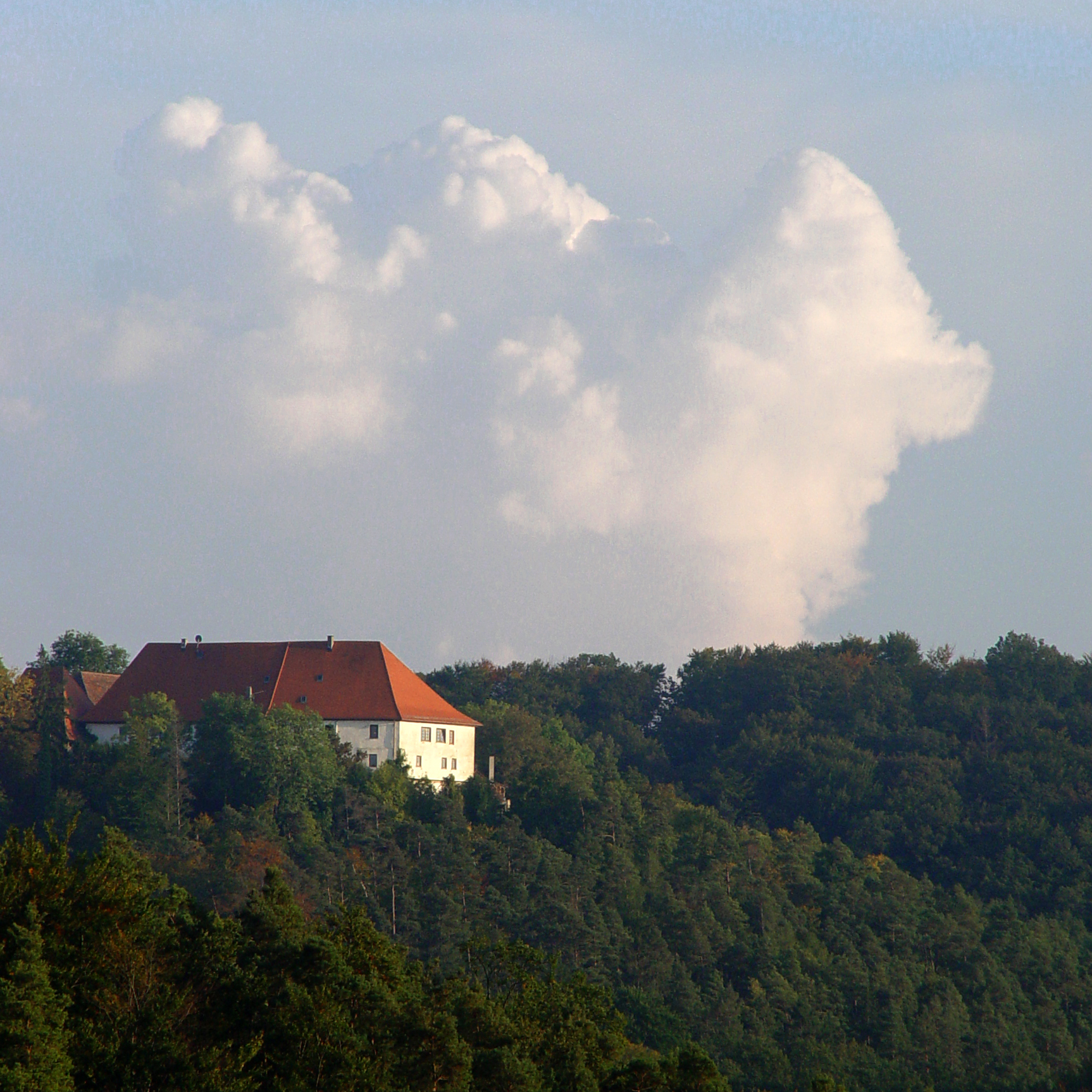
Palace of Hohenentringen (Schlossberg Entringen)

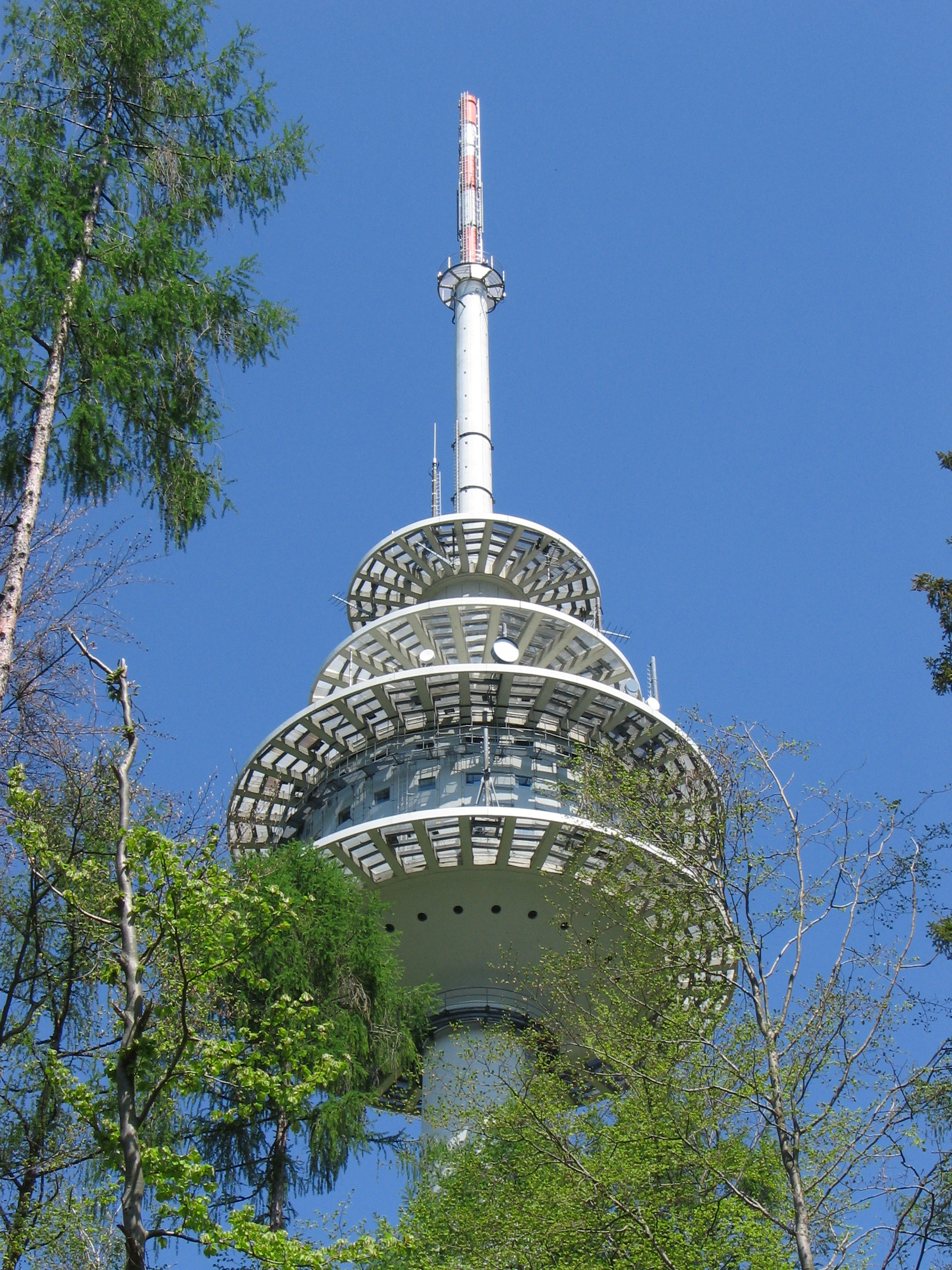
Waldenbuch Transmission Tower (Betzenberg)

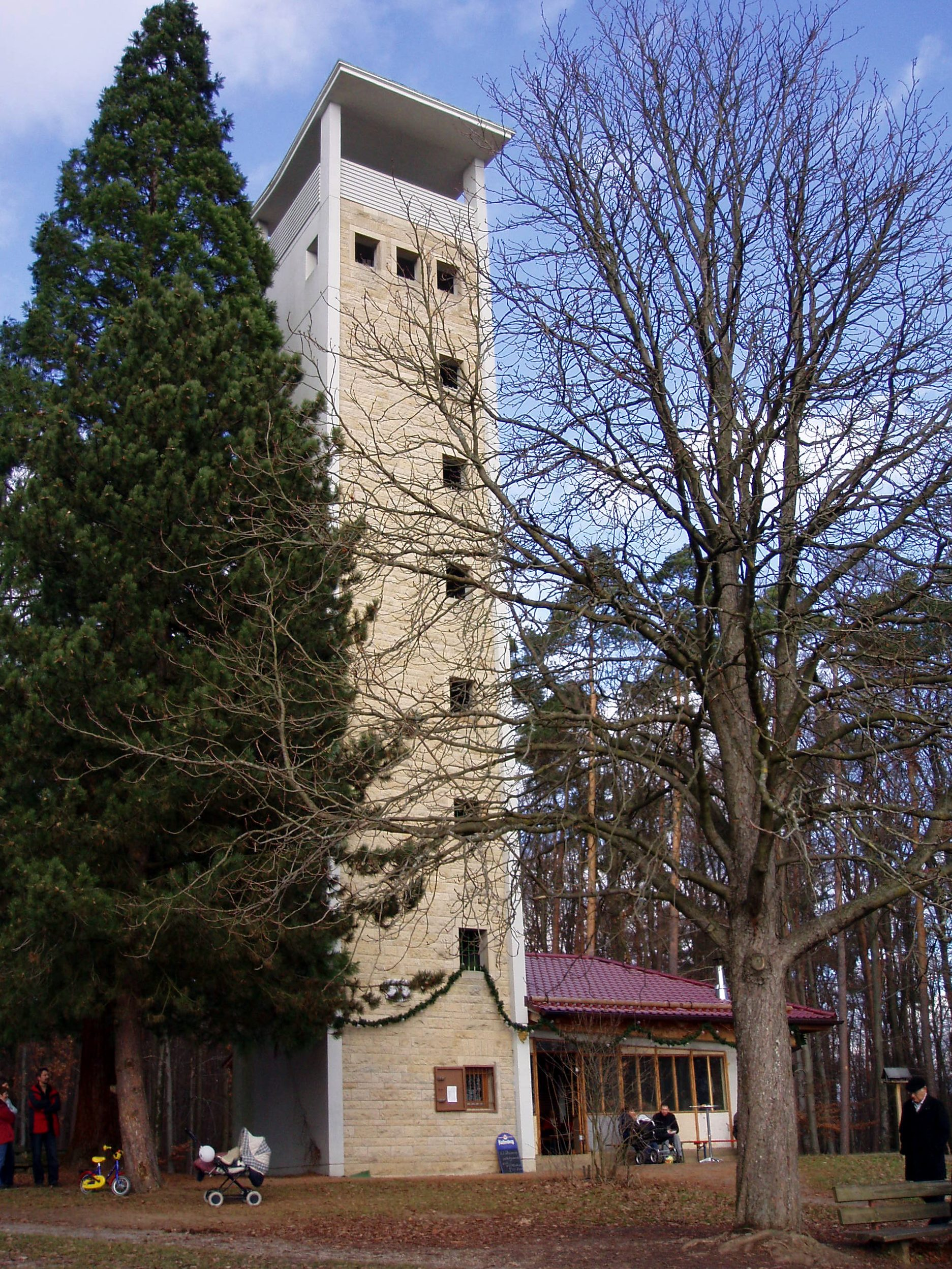
Uhlberg Tower (Uhlberg)

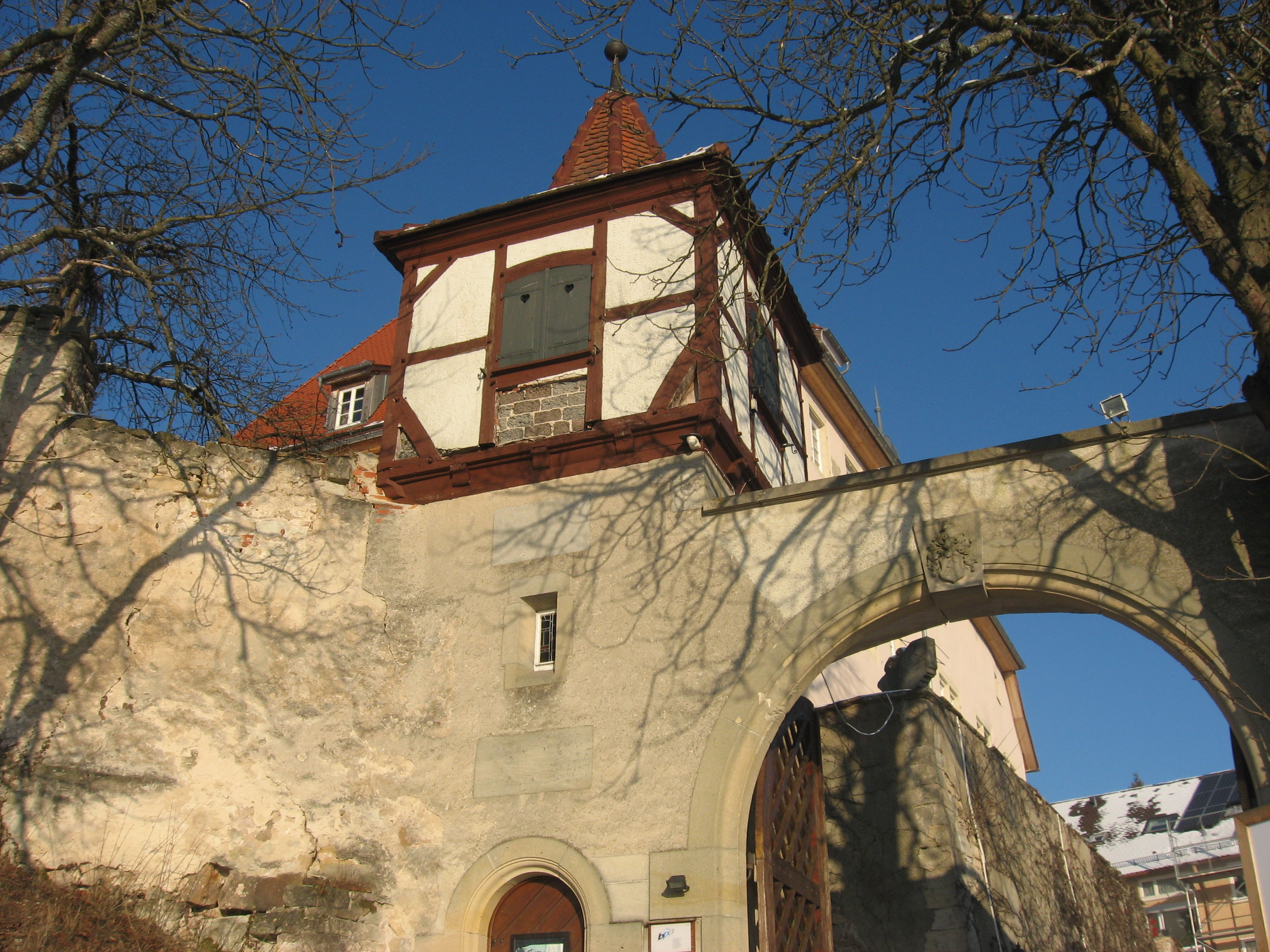
Detail of Roseck Palace (Schlossberg Unterjesingen)

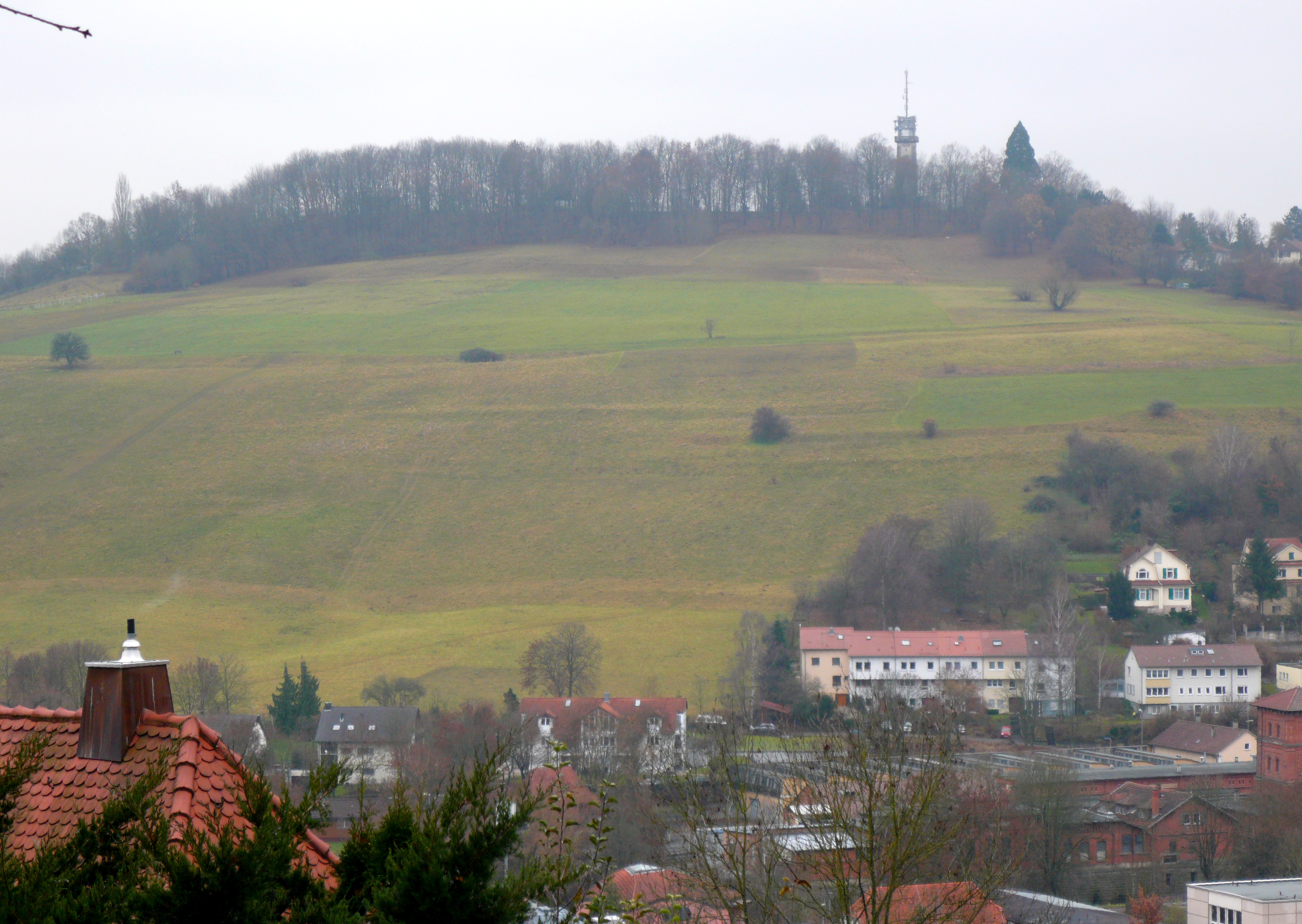
Österberg mit Österberg Tower

This list of hills of the Schönbuch contains an almost complete selection of the hills, high points and spurs or subpeaks of the Schönbuch, a forest region in the south German Keuper Uplands, and of the Schönbuch Nature Park within the German state of Baden-Württemberg.

The table below is organised in order of height in metres above sea level (NHN), but some of the columns are sortable by clicking on the symbol in the respective header.

The abbreviations used in the table are explained below.

Hill or high point	Height (m)	Location	Counties *	Part of (see Remarks) *
Bromberg	582.6	In the centre of the Schönbuch between Entringen and Altdorf	BB	Hermitage Former chapel, Schonwald Diebsteig, Wagner military cemetery (on the Gr. Goldersbach stream)
Stellberg	580.3	on the western edge of the Schönbuch 3.5 km northeast of Herrenberg	BB	Recultivated rubbish and soil tip, former quarry
Steingart	566.1	In the centre of the Schönbuch between Entringen and Weil	TÜ	
Kapf	566.0	North-northwest of Mönchberg	BB	
Grafenberg	560.9	North of Kayh	BB	Grafenberg NR (23.9 ha; 480–560 m; 19 August 1969)
Kirnberg	558.9	Northwestern spur of the Bromberg	BB	
Rötelberg	555.5	Part of the Rohrauer Köpfe southeast of Rohrau	BB	
Schönbuchspitz	546.1	North-northeast of Entringen	TÜ	Schönbuch-Westhang/Ammerbuch NR (459.0 ha; 360–540 m; 15 November 2000) (with the Pfaffenkopf in front to the south)
Burgberg Breitenholz	543.1	East-northeast of Breitenholz	TÜ	Müneck Castle, Schönbuch-Westhang/Ammerbuch NR (459.0 ha; 360–540 m; 15 November 2000)
Falkenkopf	532.2	Southwestern spur of the Bromberg	BB	
Palace ofberg Herrenberg	522.8	In Herrenberg	BB	Herrenberg Palace
Palace ofberg Rohrau	520	Part of the Rohrauer Köpfe, western spur of the Rötelberg, south of Rohrau	BB	lost castle of Rohrau
Hornkopf	515.2	North of Hagelloch	TÜ	
Schlossberg Entringen	509.9	East of Entringen	TÜ	Palace of Hohenentringen, Schönbuch-Westhang/Ammerbuch NR (459.0 ha; 360–540 m; 15 November 2000)
Eichenfirst	502.0	In the centre of the Schönbuch between Dettenhausen and Pfrondorf	RT, TÜ	Schaich Valley NR (205.9 ha; 320–360 m; 23 February 1995), Eisenbachhain NR (8.3 ha; 470–490 m; 23 August 1937)
Betzenberg	499.5	South-southwest of Glashütte	BB, ES	Waldenbuch Transmission Tower, Celtic quadrangular schanze, Schaich valley NR (205.9 ha; 320–360 m; 23 February 1995), Betzenberg Forest Educational Trail
Steinenberg (Tübingen)	492.0	On the northwestern perimeter of Tübingen	TÜ	Steinenberg Tower (OT)
Günzberg	490.5	West-southwest of Dettenhausen	BB	
Kapellenberg (Wurmlinger Berg)	475	Southwest of Tübingen, east of Hirschau	TÜ	St. Remigius Chapel (Wurmlingen Chapel)
Spitzberg	474.4	Southwest of Tübingen, northeast of Hirschau	TÜ	Former castle of Ödenburg, Hirschauer Berg NR (22.2 ha; 375–470 m; 30 July 1980), Spitzberg - Ödenburg NR (9.9 ha; 280–427 m; 22 October 1990) (Spitzberg is south of the Schönbuch)
Uhlberg	469.6	Between Plattenhardt and Neuenhaus	ES	Uhlberg Tower (OT)
Kirnberg	464.6	east of Bebenhausen	TÜ	Geological trail
Schlossberg Unterjesingen	456.8	North of Unterjesingen	TÜ	Roseck Palace, Schönbuch-Westhang/Ammerbuch NR (459.0 ha; 360–540 m; 15 November 2000)
Schaichberg	456.0	Northwest of Häslach	ES, RT	Schaichberg Tower (WT), Schaich Valley NR (205.9 ha; 320–360 m; 23 February 1995), Sulzeiche NR (1.9 ha; 445–455 m; 16 November 1981)
Österberg	437.9	In Tübingen	TÜ	Österberg Tower (former OT)
Dürrenberg	433.1	Southwest of Rübgarten	RT	
Keßlerhau (local name)	417.2	West of Waldenbuch	BB	Neuweiler Viehweide NR (13.5 ha; 370–417.2 m; 3 January 1984)
Steinenberg (Aichtal)	383.1	Between Neuenhaus and Aich	ES	Aich Viaduct

== Abbreviations and key ==
The abbreviations used in the table (alphabetically sorted) mean:

Counties:

- BB = Landkreis Böblingen
- ES = Landkreis Esslingen
- RT = Landkreis Reutlingen
- TÜ = Landkreis Tübingen

Other:

- OT = observation tower
- ha = hectare
- NR = Nature reserve
- WT = water tower

The Part of column usually gives details of the local nature reserve, which is almost never on the hilltop, but on its sides or at its foot. The area in hectares, height in metres (m) above Normalhöhennull (NHN) and the date of foundation are given.

== See also ==
- List of mountains and hills of Baden-Württemberg
