= Bromberg (Schönbuch) =

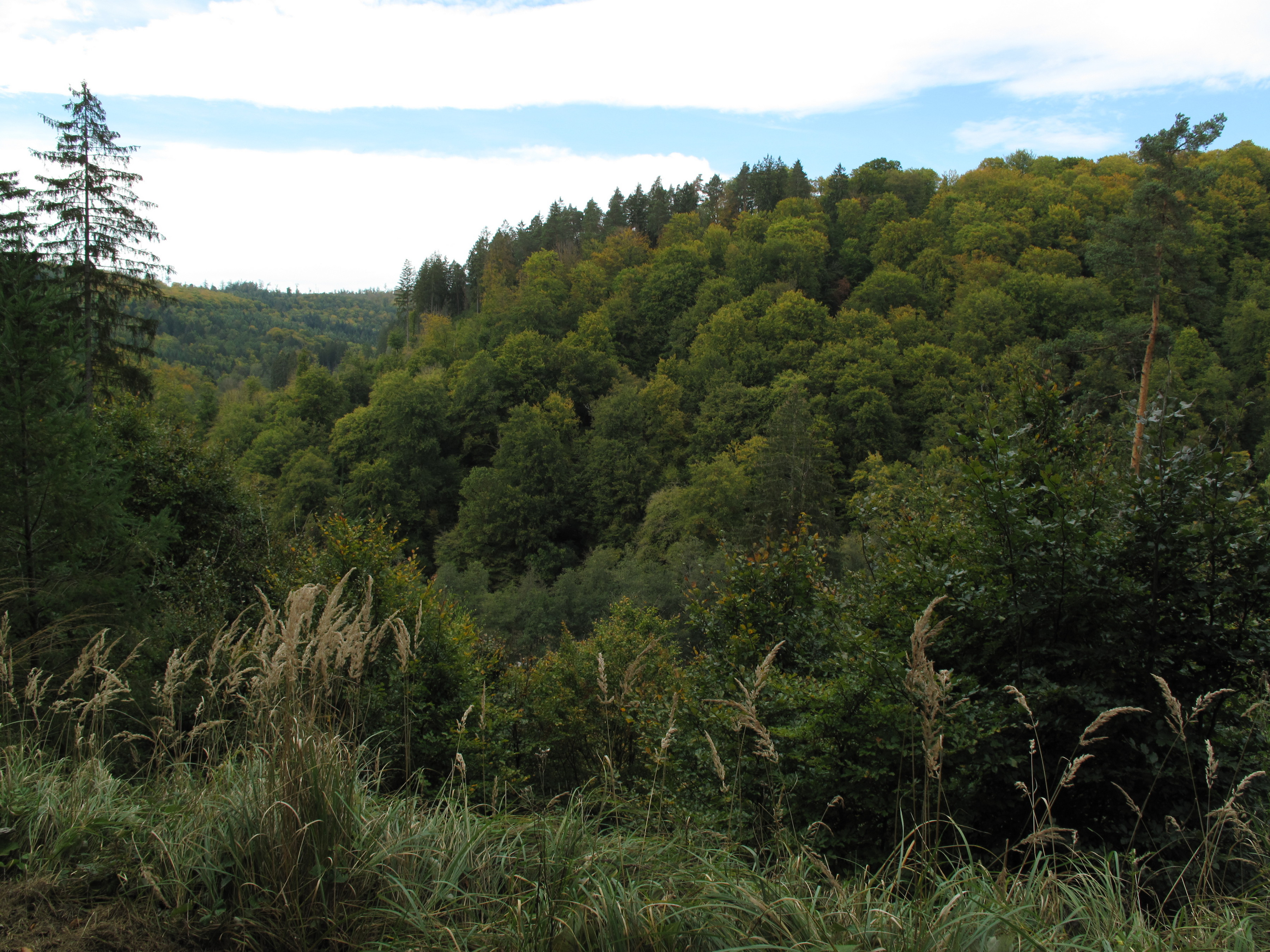
- The Bromberg in the Schönbuch

Highest point
- Elevation: 582.6 m above sea level (NHN) (1,911 ft)
- Coordinates: 48°35′39″N 8°59′48″E

Geography
- Location within Baden-Württemberg
- Location: near Altdorf; Böblingen, Baden-Württemberg (Germany)
- Parent range: Schönbuch

Geology
- Rock type: Keuper

The Bromberg is a hill in Baden-Württemberg, Germany.

== See also ==
- List of hills of the Schönbuch
