= Hagelloch =

- Stadtteil of Tübingen
- Coat of arms
- Interactive map of Hagelloch
- Location within Germany Location within Baden-Württemberg
- Coordinates: 48°32′27″N 09°03′38″E
- Country: Germany
- State: Baden-Württemberg
- Admin. region: Tübingen
- District: Tübingen
- Town: Tübingen

Area
  - Total: 5.97 km^{2} (2.31 sq mi)

Population (2020-12-31)
  - Total: 1,713
  - Density: 287/km^{2} (743/sq mi)
- Time zone: UTC+01:00 (CET)
  - Summer (DST): UTC+02:00 (CEST)
- Vehicle registration: TÜ
- Website: www.tuebingen.de

Hagelloch is an administrative district of Tübingen situated around three kilometres to the northwest of the town centre. Hagelloch is known beyond Tübingen for its picturesque setting near Schönbuch and the view across Tübingen.

== History ==
Hagelloch was originally known as Hagenloch and meant a 'wood surrounded by a hedge'. It was first mentioned in records in 1106.

The oldest owners of Hagelloch were the Palatinate counts of Tübingen. Count Gottfried sold Hagelloch to Bebenhausen Abbey in 1296 which retained ownership of the district until the cloister was dissolved in 1807. For centuries the district suffered from severe poverty.

During the 19th century, many areas of Germany underwent 'Realteilung' - a redistribution of land and property - which also affected Hagelloch and small landowners. In the first half of the 19th century 43.1% of the inhabitants of Hagelloch were manual workers (such as bricklayers, plasterers and carpenters), 18.6% farmers and 11.6% 'day labourers'.

In the 1970s Hagelloch became popular among commuters to nearby Tübingen and even Stuttgart. After peaking in 1999, the population has settled to its current level of 1796.

== Events ==
Village in Hagelloch comes to life through its festivals and clubs with concerts throughout the year, sports weekends and a triathlon. The 2-day summer festival is organised by the local musician society. This society serves the care and support of the dull folk music and related even more dull attempts. The Christian youth group organises a handball tournament and an annual festival. On 30 April the 'May Enunciation' takes place outside the town hall with the erection of a May pole accompanied by music and singing.

== Transportation ==
Hagelloch is served by local buses from Tübingen (Lines 8 and 18) and the night bus N97.
