= Østerberg =

Østerberg is a Norwegian surname. Notable people with the name include:

- Dag Østerberg (1938-2017), Norwegian sociologist, philosopher and musicologist
- Erling Østerberg (1901–1981), Norwegian police officer

== See also ==
- Osterberg, German municipality
- Österberg, surname
