= Spitzberg (Tübingen) =

Mountain in Baden-Württemberg, Germany

Coordinates: 48°30′37″N 9°00′43″E

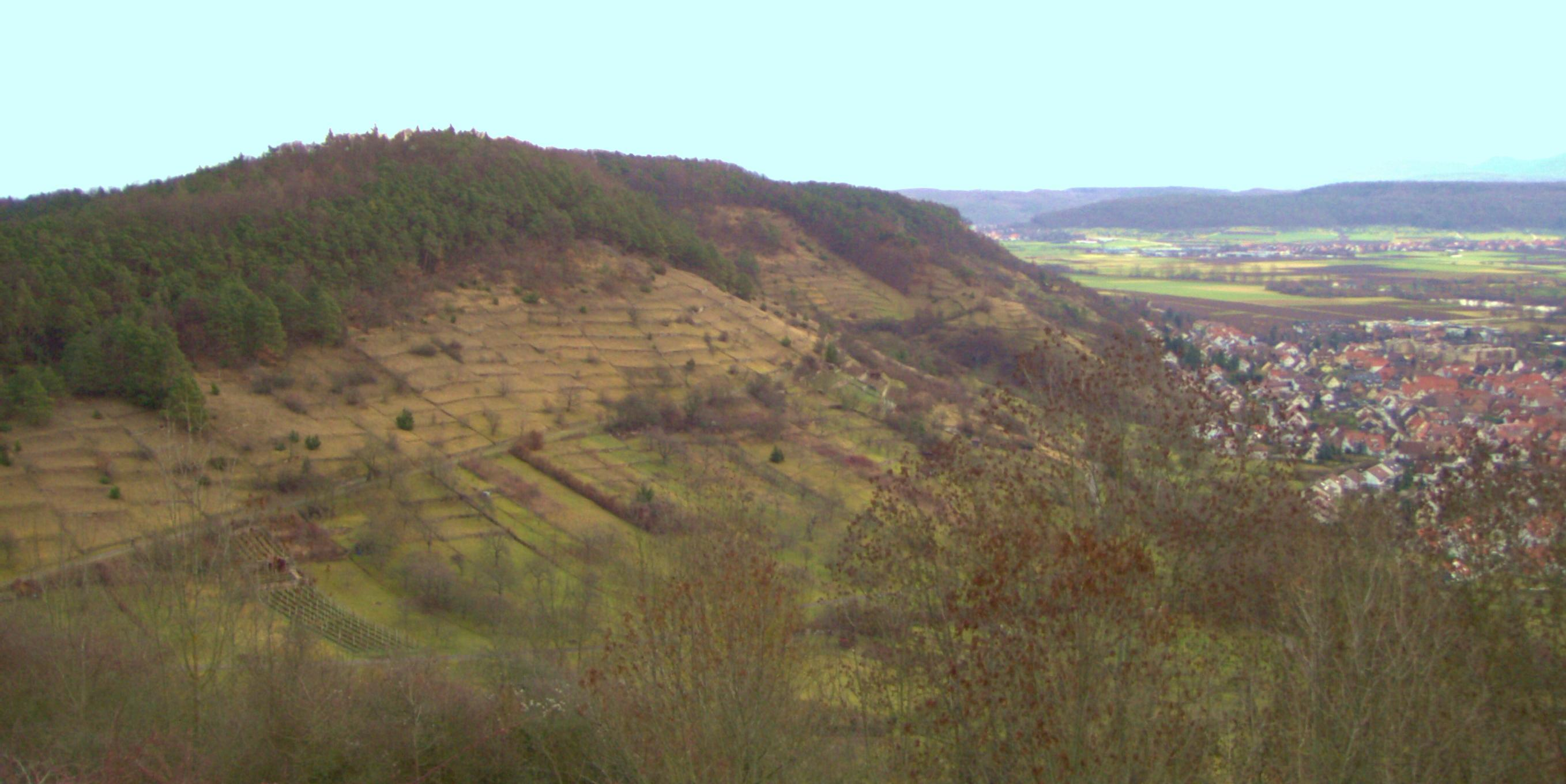

Highest point
- Elevation: 474.4 m (1,556 ft)

Geography
- Location: Baden-Württemberg, Germany

Spitzberg (Tübingen) (German pronunciation: [ˈʃpɪt͡sˌbɛʁk]) is a mountain of Baden-Württemberg, Germany. It is located within the city of Tübingen.

== See also ==
- List of hills of the Schönbuch
