= Uhlberg =

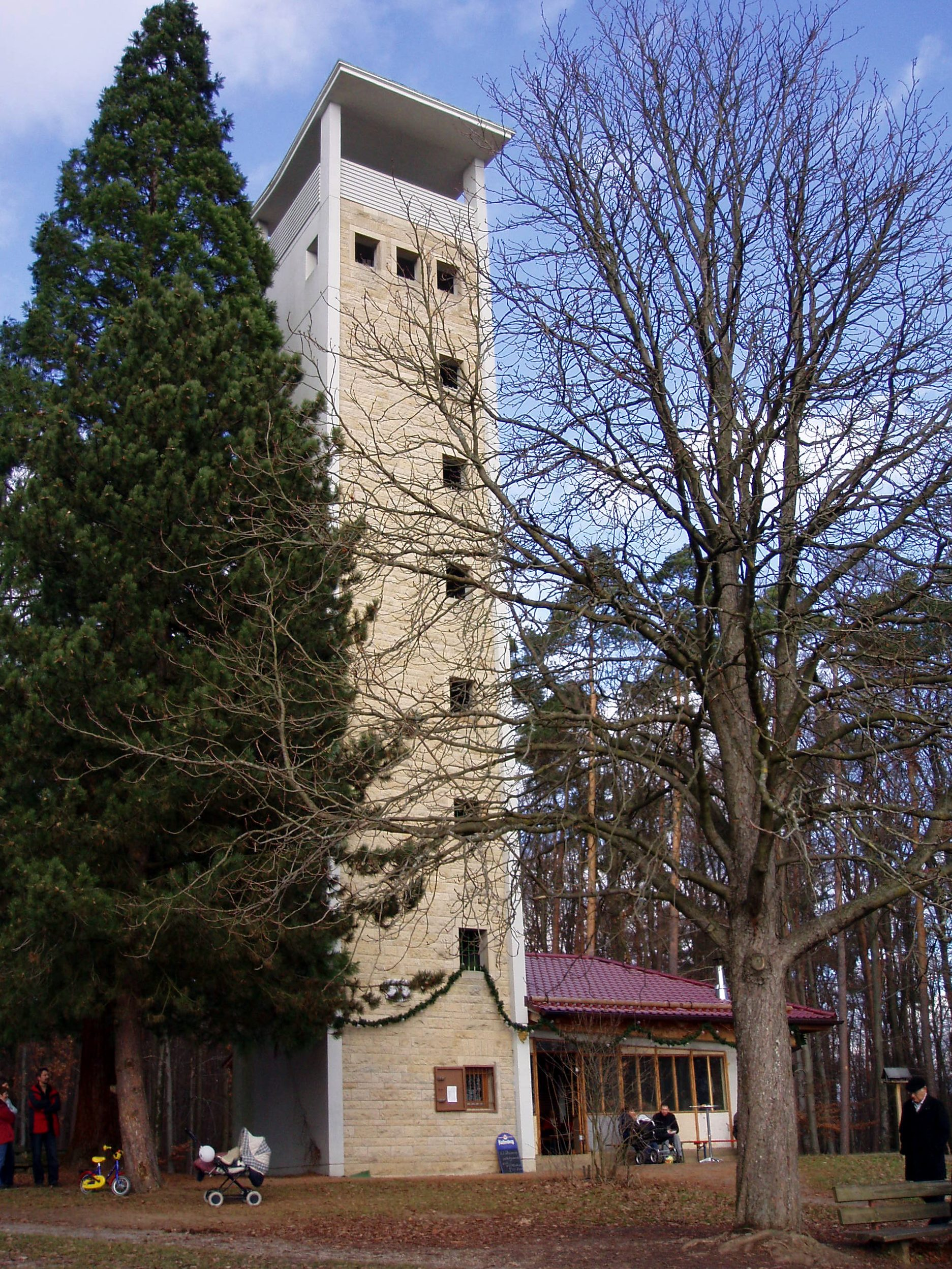
- Uhlberg's Viewing tower

Highest point
- Elevation: 469.6 m above sea level (NHN) (1,541 ft)
- Listing: Uhlberg Tower (viewing tower)
- Coordinates: 48°38′5″N 9°12′22″E

Geography
- Location within Baden-Württemberg
- Location: near Filderstadt; Esslingen, Baden-Württemberg (Germany)
- Parent range: Schönbuch

Geology
- Rock type: Keuper

The Uhlberg is a hill in Baden-Württemberg, Germany.
