= Entringen =

- Village
- Flag
- Nickname: Storchenschendler
- Coordinates: 48°33′N 8°58′E
- Country: Germany
- State: Baden-Württemberg
- District: Tübingen

Area
  - Total: 5.38 sq mi (13.94 km^{2})
  - Land: 5.38 sq mi (13.94 km^{2})
  - Water: 0 sq mi (0 km^{2})
- Elevation: 1,180 ft (360 m)

Population (2008)
  - Total: 3,718
- Time zone: UTC+1 (CET)
- ZIP code: 72119
- Area code: 07073
- Licence plate code: TÜ
- Website: www.ammerbuch.de

Entringen is a part and the administrative seat of the municipality Ammerbuch in the district of Tübingen in the state of Baden-Württemberg (Germany).

== Geography ==
Entringen is on the western edge of the Schönbuch in 360 to 545 meters height. The cities Tübingen and Herrenberg are each about six miles away and accessible quickly by the B 28 or Ammertalbahn. Saint Michael's Evangelical Church dominates the town center with its striking green tower. Hohenentringen Castle overlooks the town from a hill to the east of the town centre.

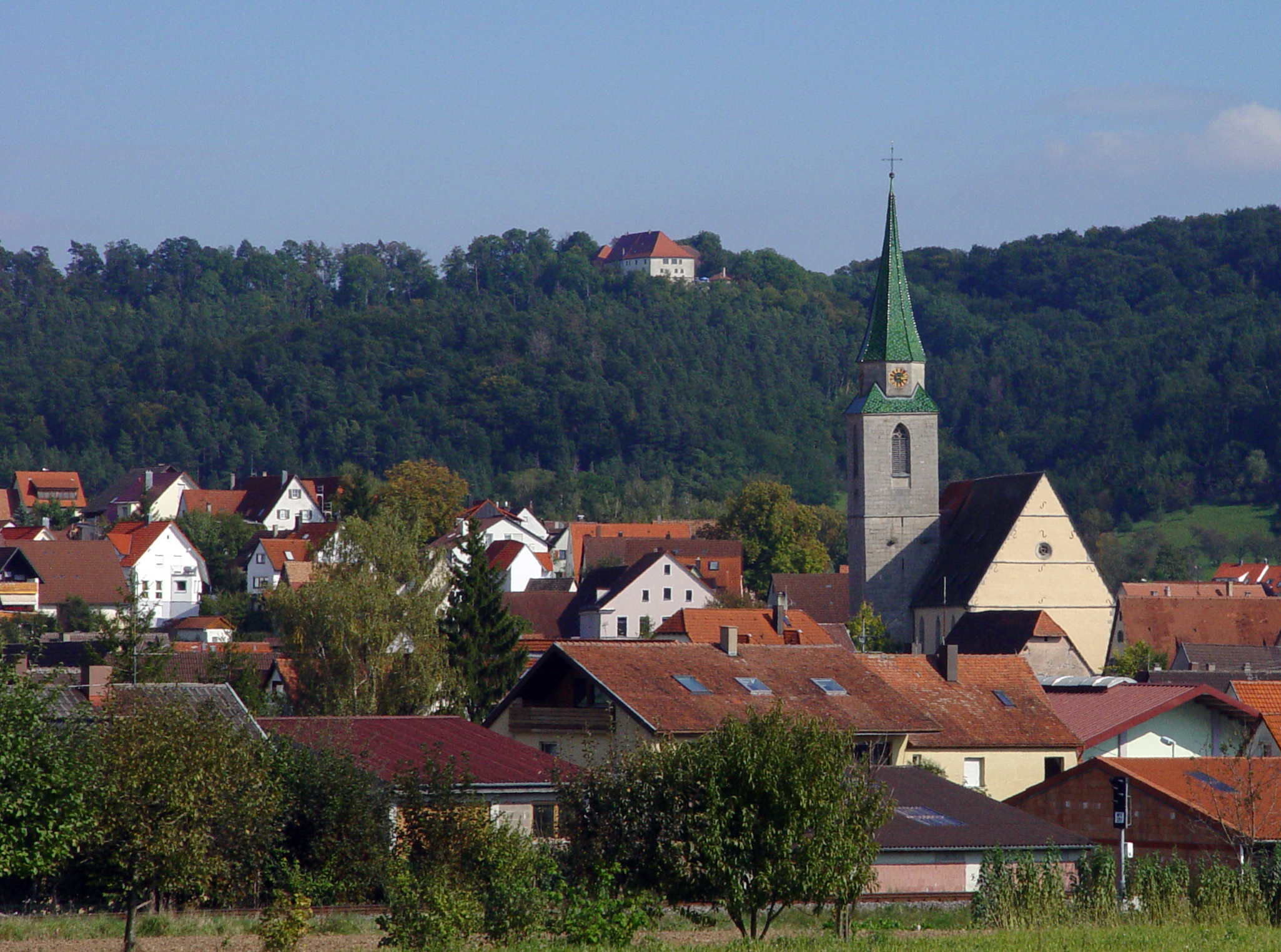
Entringen with St. Michael and Hohenentringen in the background

== History ==
The earliest findings in Entringen are Alamanni graves from the 5th century. The grave of a well-equipped warrior was found in the 1930s in the area of today's Bahnhofstraße/Zeppelinstraße, and points to an Alemannic settlement dating to the 5th century. In 1999, a horse grave was found near the warrior's grave site, and is thought to be the horse belonging to the warrior. Entringen developed over the centuries by the Alemannic settlement to a predominantly agricultural, Württemberg village. The name Antringen first appeared in 1075 in conjunction with the Lord Adalbertus de Antringen on the charter of the Hirsau abbey. In the year 1284, Hohenentringen is mentioned for the first time. In 1296, the Bebenhausen Abbey acquires the Entringer Fronhof. Construction of the present St. Michael's Church began in 1452.

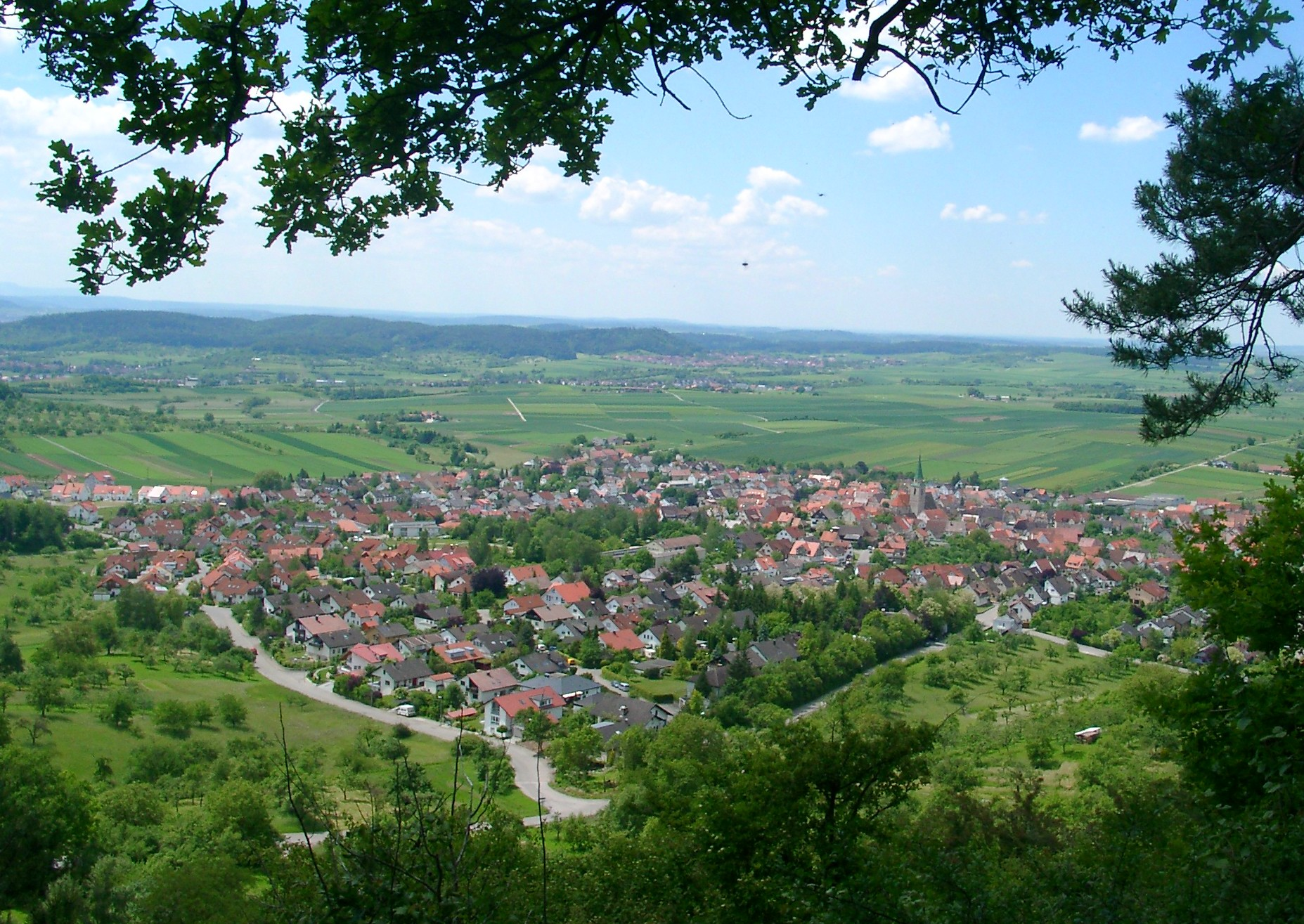
View on Entringen from the "Schönbuchspitz"

The village of Entringen had about 1,100 people in 1600. Due to the plague and the Thirty Years War, the population declined to about 470. In 1806, the road from Tübingen to Herrenberg, that ran through Altingen and Reusten, was moved to Entringen. Shortly thereafter, in 1808, Entringen became a part of Oberamt Herrenberg instead of Oberamt Tübingen. In 1827, the cemetery was moved from its previous location at St. Michael's church to the edge of the village. In the years 1843-44, a new town hall was built. In 1855, the municipality acquired six looms in order to provide a practical education, as well as livelihood, for children from poor families. The local Volunteer Fire Department was founded in 1862. In 1877 the Lords of Ow acquired the Hohenentringen Castle.

In the years 1909-1910, Entringen was connected to the newly constructed Ammertalbahn, linking Entringen by rail with Tübingen, Herrenberg, and Stuttgart. Gypsum mining began between Entringen and Breitenholz in 1910. The public swimming pool was constructed in 1936. Two years later, Entringen was transferred from Oberamt Herrenberg back to the district of Tübingen. Entringen was part of the Baden-Württemberg district reform in 1971. Six previously independent villages were united as the municipality of Ammerbuch on December 1, 1971. Today Entringen has about 3,700 inhabitants and is a place with good infrastructure and high recreational value. The coat of arms of the formerly independent municipality Entringen contains a horizontal black deer rack that connects to Württemberg with a floating duck reflecting on water; it was accepted by the community in 1929. Entringen's official colors are white and red.

== Attractions ==
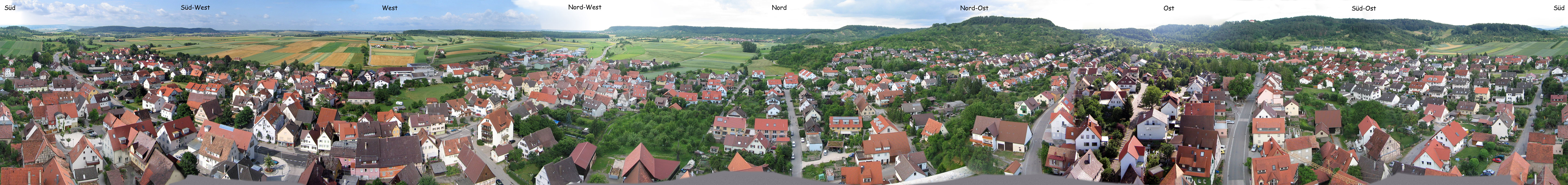
Panorama from St. Michael

The origins of the Church St. Michael go to the 9th century back (hall church). 1275 The parish is first mentioned (Diocese Constance). The oldest bell, the Ave-Maria, is from the first half of the 14th Century. The nave of the Gothic parish church was built in 1452 and reformed several times inside. The last major renovation was in 1967. The organ was begun by Christian Gotthilf Haußdörffer and Johann Christian Hagemann completed 1764. In 1972 a new organ by Oesterle is installed in the old housing. In 1999, the organ of is redeveloped and its sound extended. In the choir is a triptych by Manfred Luz (2002): Michael has the fallen angel in his place shows him at the same time the way to the light. A partnership of the parishes with district Kittelsthal of the city Ruhla exists since 1990.

The Castle Hohenentringen was created in the 12th century on top of the mountain, probably because it was too unsafe down in the village. The founders were the lords of Entringen (Adalbertus de Antringen). By 1300 the last of the Entringer died. The heirs of the castle were the lords of Ehingen, Gültlingen and Hailfingen. The present castle was built in the 15th and 16th Century and rebuilt more often. Five related families lived there in 1417. On Sundays, they went with their 100 children in so stately train to church that first arrived in the village, while the latter left the castle.

This scene was painted in 1913 by Gunhild von Ow and hangs today in the guest room. Christian Heinrich Zeller was born on 29th of March in 1779 on Hohenentringen. He is remembered as a Christian educator and father, a teacher of the Swabian pietism as one of the great pioneers of the Inner Mission and as a songwriter.

In the Naturpark Schönbuch there is a Hermann-Lons Fountain, designed and build by a group of friends around the Tübingen artist Ugge Bärtle in the mid-1920s.

== Literature ==
- Reinhold Bauer, et al. Entringen. Fotografien erzählen aus der Ortsgeschichte. Verlag Schwäbisches Tagblatt, Tübingen 2000, ISBN 3-928011-40-5.
- Reinhold Bauer, Barbara Scholkmann (Hrsg.): Die Kirche im Dorf St. Michael in Entringen. Verlag Schwäbisches Tagblatt, Tübingen 2002, ISBN 3-928011-51-0.
