= Dettenhausen =

- Municipality
- Coat of arms

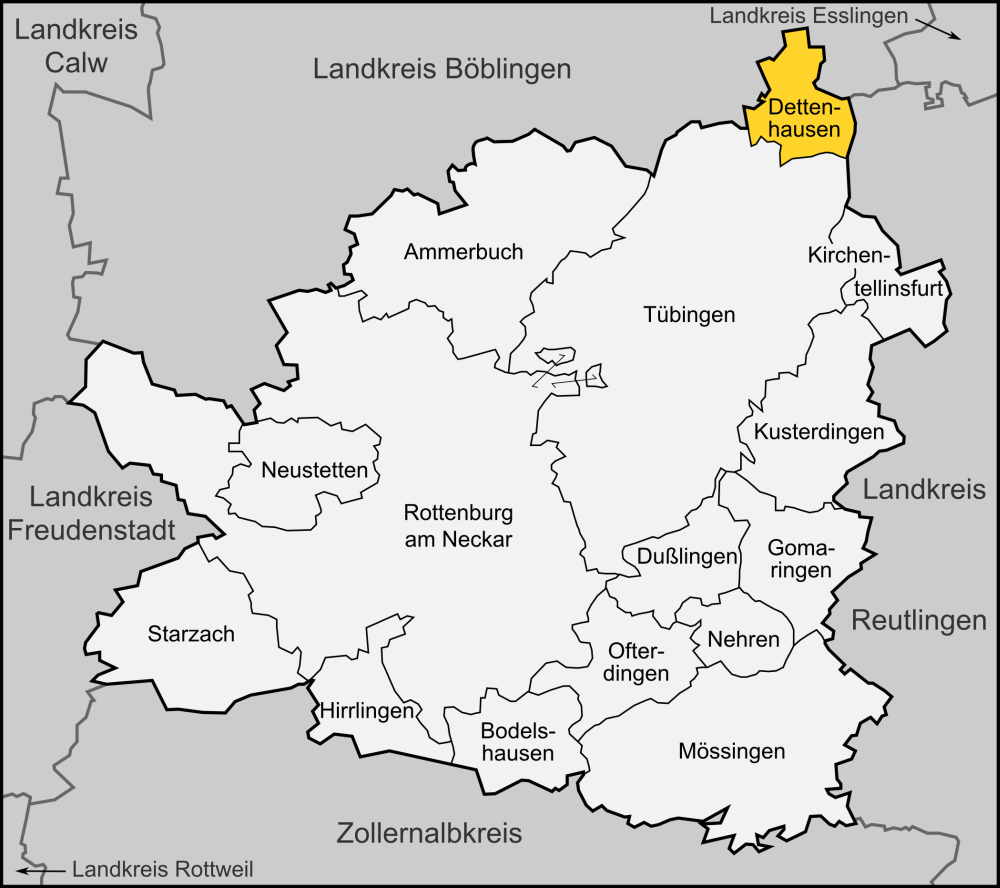
- Location of Dettenhausen within Tübingen district
- Interactive map of Dettenhausen
- Location within Germany Location within Baden-Württemberg
- Coordinates: 48°36′27″N 9°06′03″E
- Country: Germany
- State: Baden-Württemberg
- Admin. region: Tübingen
- District: Tübingen

Government
  - Mayor (2018–26): Thomas Engesser

Area
  - Total: 11.02 km^{2} (4.25 sq mi)
- Elevation: 412 m (1,352 ft)

Population (2025-12-31)
  - Total: 5,506
  - Density: 499.6/km^{2} (1,294/sq mi)
- Time zone: UTC+01:00 (CET)
  - Summer (DST): UTC+02:00 (CEST)
- Postal codes: 72135
- Dialling codes: 07157
- Vehicle registration: TÜ
- Website: www.dettenhausen.de

Dettenhausen (German pronunciation: [dɛtn̩ˈhaʊzn̩]; Swabian: Deddahausa) is a municipality in the district of Tübingen in Baden-Württemberg in Germany.

Dettenhausen is a village in the administrative district (Kreis) of Tübingen, in the Schönbuch Nature Park. It is located 11 km north of Tübingen, and about 25 km south of Stuttgart, the capital of Baden-Württemberg. Dettenhausen was first officially mentioned in the Codex Hirsaugiensis in around 1100 AD as "Detenhusen". Dettenhausen has 5.441 citizens (as of December 31, 2013). Dettenhausen's coat of arms is a red deer against a yellow background with a yellow ear of grains against a red background.

The Schönbuchbahn railway links Dettenhausen with Böblingen, where it connects with lines S1 and S60 of the Stuttgart S-Bahn.

== Geography ==
The large, natural forests of the Schönbuch are located in the midst of the densely populated, highly industrialized Neckar region. This is a leisure destination for local residents, home to many species of plants and animals and an essential source of fresh air for the region whilst at the same time producing wood, a natural and sustainable raw material. At the end of the 1960s, there were plans to build a new airport for Stuttgart here, but these were thwarted by the resistance of a large part of the population and a number of official bodies.

As a result, it was decided to establish a nature park in the extensive forests between Böblingen, Sindelfingen, Herrenberg and Tübingen in 1972. Schönbuch Nature Park is an almost completely wooded part of the Swabian terraced landscape between the Black Forest and the Swabian Jura. The giant steps of the Schönbuch are formed by alternating strata of sandstone and clay which have eroded at different speeds. The hard Keuper mountains rise up from the agricultural land of the Gäu plain to the west, forming the characteristic southern edge of the Schönbuch with their hard sandstones.

== Neighboring communities ==
The following cities and municipalities border the municipality Dettenhausen; they are in a clockwise direction starting called the north and part of the district of Böblingen or to the counties Reutlingen and Tübingen: Waldenbuch, Walddorfhäslach, Pliezhausen, Tübingen and Weil im Schönbuch.

== Municipality arrangement ==
The municipality Dettenhausen include the village Dettenhausen and detached Hirschland.

== History ==
The first documented mention of the church as Dete Husen was around the year 1100. However, it is assumed that about 700 people had already settled at the site.

== Politics ==
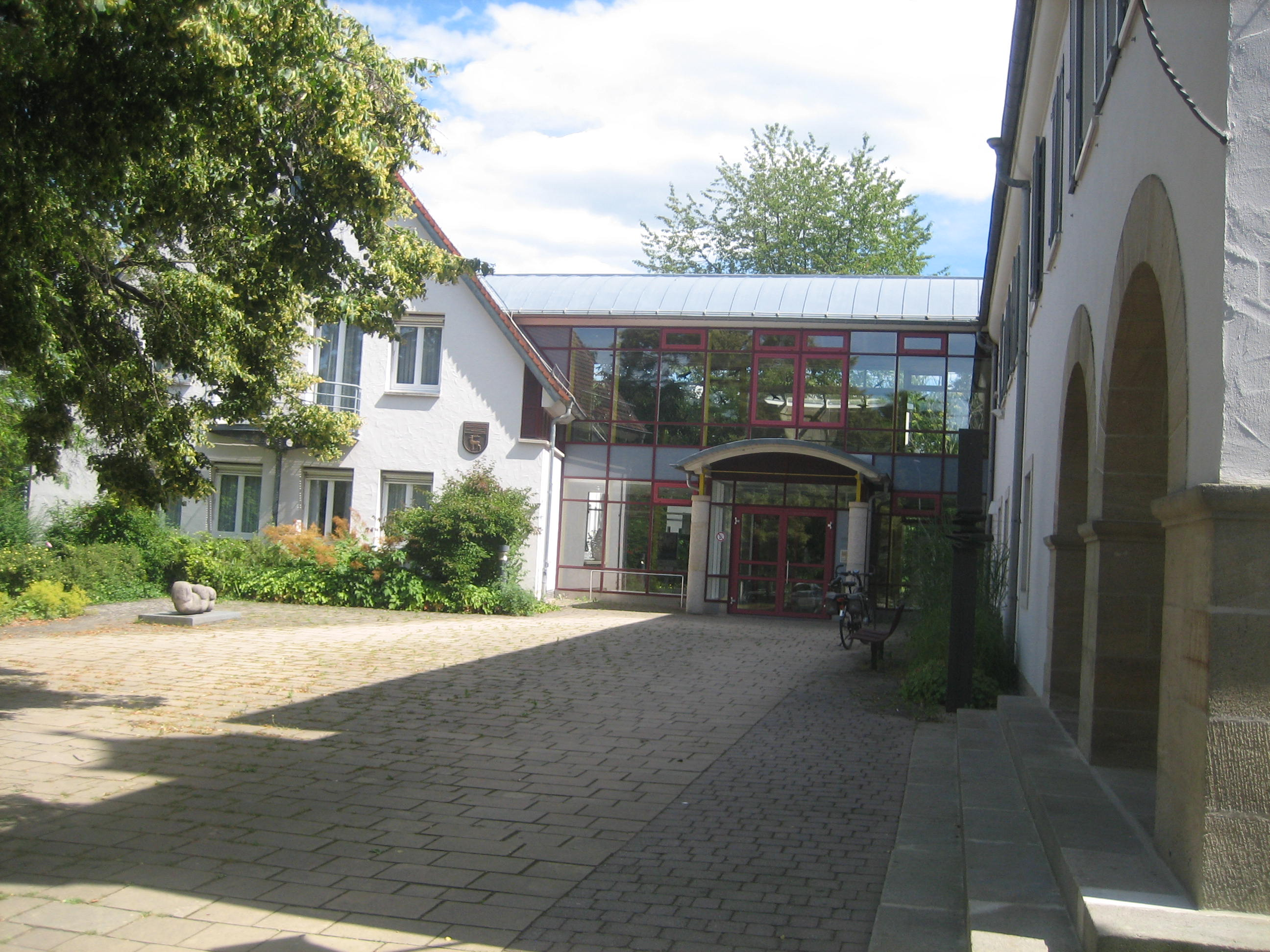
Town hall Dettenhausen

The local council elections on 25 May 2014 resulted in the following distribution of seats:

- FWV: 9 seats
- CDU: 3 seats
- SPD: 2 seats

== Local attractions ==
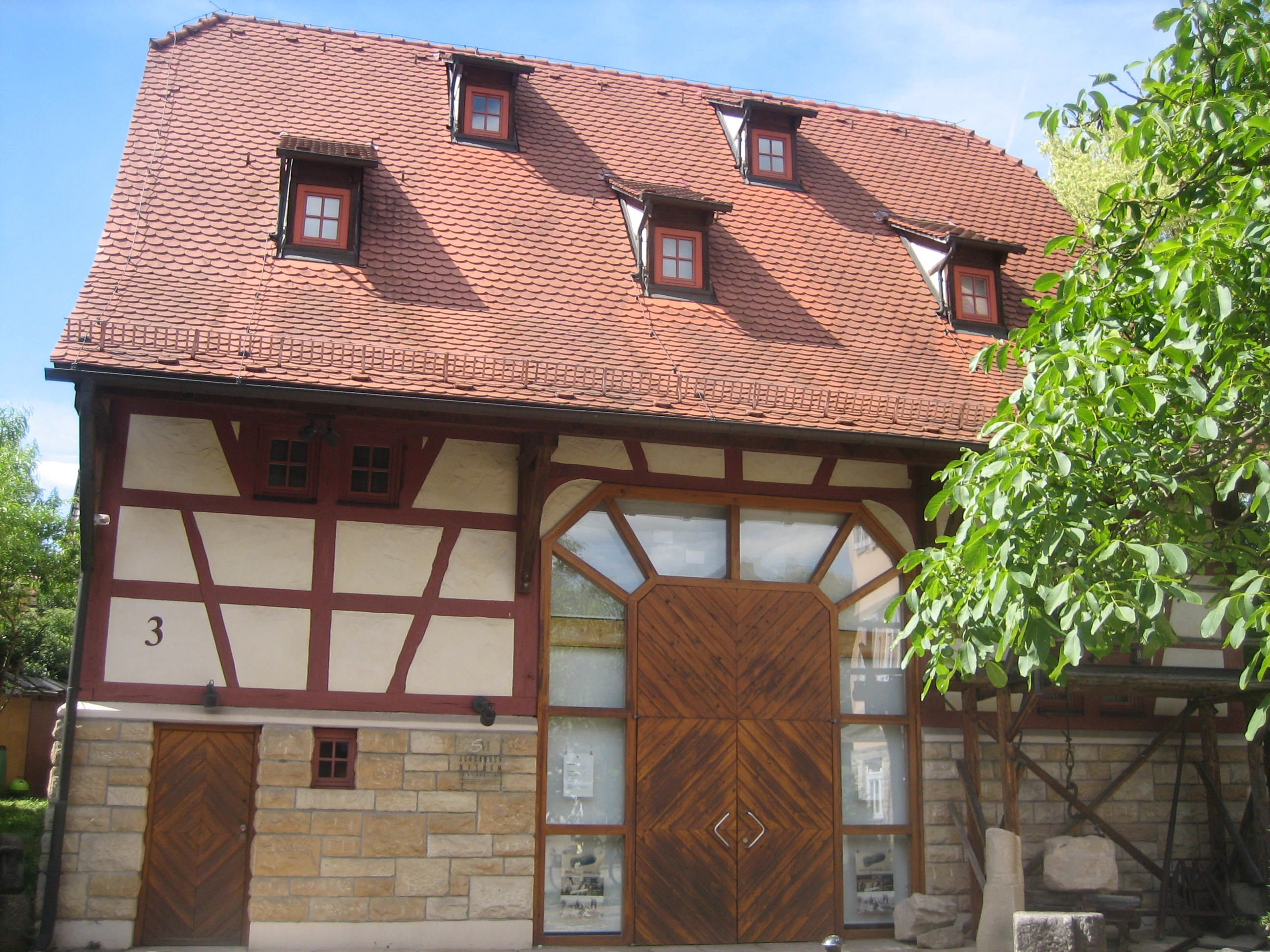
Schönbuchmuseum Dettenhausen Jagd, Stein und Wald (district of Tübingen) Germany

Dettenhausen offers hiking, swimming, and the Schönbuchmuseum, the local museum. Dettenhausen has a city program with two cities, one in the former East of Germany, Treuen and one in Hungary, Tab.

The Schönbuch Museum shows in the areas of hunting, stone and wood much about life in the area.

In the Polizeimuseum a historic international collection of police uniforms from Bernhard Strobel can be seen.

A memorial for Gottlieb Aberle is at the cemetery in Dettingen and in Riedlingen. Gottlieb Aberle was on April 21, 1945 for allegedly "aiding the enemy" with two other prisoners by shot in the neck by a command of the Gestapo in the forest near Riedlingen murdered. His offense: He had found two downed Canadian aviator pilots in Schönbuch and taken with him.

== Transport ==
The country road 1208 leads north to the south of Stuttgart and Tübingen.

The Schönbuchbahn Württembergische railway company connects the town with Böblingen and therefore with the S-Bahn to Stuttgart. In 2011 the Schönbuchbahn celebrated its centenary. In 2010 the Schönbuch Museum had two special railway-themed exhibitions.

Public transport is ensured by the Verkehrsverbund Neckar-Alb-Donau (NALDO). The community is located in the comb 109.

== District heating ==
In Dettenhausen there has been a wood heating plant since 2009. The cogeneration plant will supply the place gradually with district heating. In 2011 a civil association was established for this purpose. The heating network in the area of the railway station to Dettenhausen will be expanded.

== Media ==
The local dailies are Swabian Tagblatt Tübingen and Stuttgarter Nachrichten.

== Historical buildings ==
The Evangelical Church of St. John was built from 1833 to 1834 to plans by Ludwig Friedrich Gaab in government financial institution style.

== Notable people ==
=== Freemen ===
- Helmuth Bächle (1917–2007), mayor 1949-1979
- Stefan Nau (born 1930), entrepreneur

=== Sons and daughters of the town ===
- Bernhard Zeller (1919–2008), literary historian and archivist
- Wilfried Huber (1925–1986), higher education and education policy-makers, educationalist
- Felix Huby (born 1938), journalist and author of crime novels

=== People who live or have lived in Dettenhausen ===
- Lotte Reiniger (1899–1981), was last seen alive and died in Dettenhausen
- Robert Schlienz (1924–1995), national football team, lived in Dettenhausen
- Uwe Stamer (1944), evangelical religion teacher

=== People who worked on site ===
Ludwig Friedrich Gaab (1800–1869), an architect of the St. John's Church in Dettenhausen

== Literature ==
Comprehensive materials for church history can be found in the town chronicle Dettenhausen - past and present, Silberburg-Verlag, Tübingen 2000, ISBN 3-87407-367-X (in German).
