= Österberg =

Österberg is a Swedish surname. Notable people with the name include:

- Anders Österberg (born 1981), Swedish politician
- Iggy Pop (born 1947), American singer, birth name James Österberg
- Laura Österberg Kalmari (born 1979), Finnish football player
- Martina Bergman-Österberg (1849–1915), Swedish-born physical education instructor
- Mikael Österberg (born 1986), Swedish ice hockey defenceman
- Sven-Erik Österberg (born 1955), Swedish politician

== See also ==
- Osterberg, German municipality
- Østerberg, surname
