= Schönbuch =

Forest in Baden-Württemberg, Germany

Coordinates: 48°35′N 9°03′E

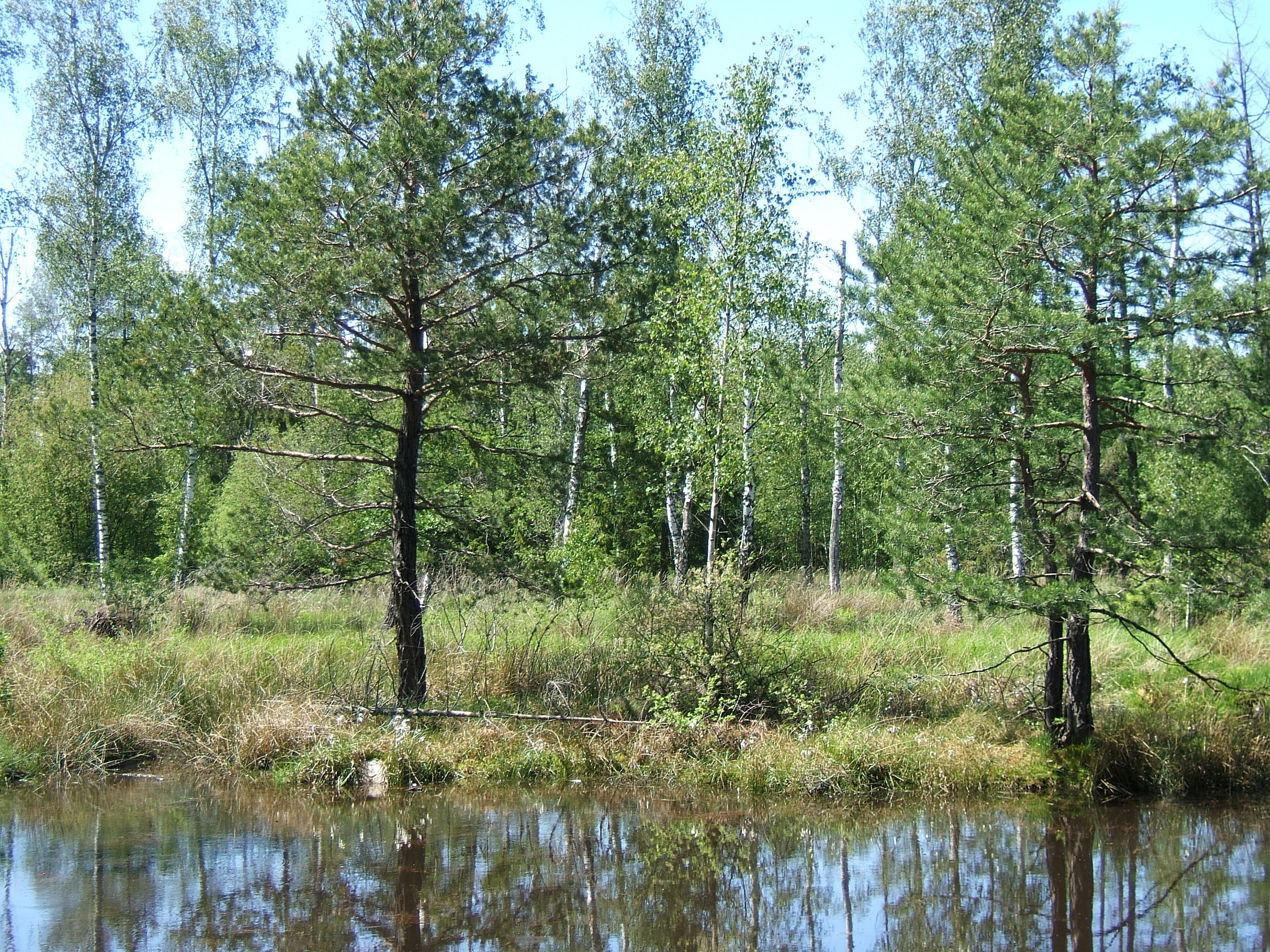
Birkensee, a bog in the Schönbuch

Schönbuch (German pronunciation: [ˈʃøːnbuːx]; Swabian: Scheebuach) is an almost completely wooded area southwest of Stuttgart and part of the Southern German Escarpment Landscape (German: südwestdeutsches Schichtstufenland). In 1972, the central zone of Schönbuch became the first nature park in Baden-Württemberg.

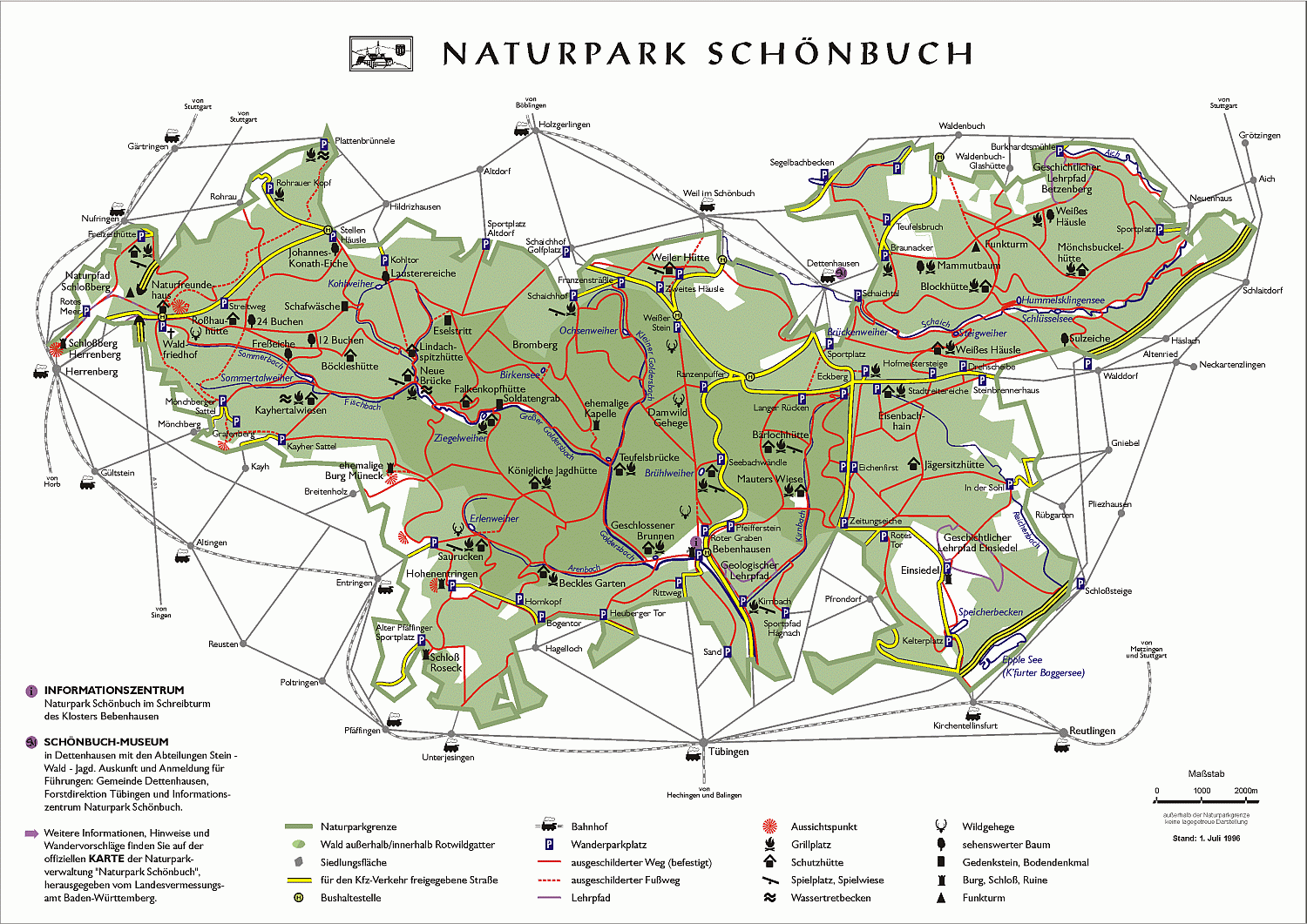
Map of the Schönbuch Nature Park

The borders of the Schönbuch-Region are vague; however, the area of the Nature Park itself is strictly defined and is discernible from the adjacent areas. In the south, west, and east, the borders of the Nature Park and Schönbuch-Region are roughly the same; however, the region’s boundaries also include the cities and communities which lie on its edges. The southern border is defined by the Ammer and Neckar river valleys. The western boundary is generally accepted to lie within the Gäu flats, beginning east of the Filder Plateau. The features making up the northern edge of the region are the Siebenmühlental (Seven-Mill Valley), a clearing in the forest referred to as the “Schönbuchlichtung,” along with the surrounding woodlands. In the Schönbuchlichtung lie the villages of (from west clockwise) Hildrizhausen, Altdorf, Holzgerlingen, Schönaich, Steinenbronn, and Waldenbuch, with Weil im Schönbuch and Dettenhausen sitting in the southern portion of the clearing.

== Location ==
The Schönbuch is located in central Baden-Württemberg – approximately 25 km south of the city center of Stuttgart and about 15 km southwest of Stuttgart Airport. It is also close to Reutlingen (south-east), the university city of Tübingen (south), Herrenberg (southwest), and Böblingen (northwest).

== Transport ==
A commuter train called the Schönbuchbahn runs through the Schönbuch, connecting Dettenhausen to Böblingen where it links to the S-Bahn system.

== Awards ==
The Schönbuch was awarded the title of "forest area of the year 2014" and "quality nature park".

== Nature Reserves ==
The Schönbuch Nature Park is the largest contiguous forest reserve in the Stuttgart region. The park boundaries were established in the 1974 Nature Park Ordnance. The reserve spans approximately 25 kilometers (about 15.5 miles) from east to west and around 10 kilometers (about 6.2 miles) from north to south. Much of Schönbuch is located within the rural districts of Böblingen and Tübingen, with smaller areas included in the Esslingen and Reutlingen rural districts.

Bebenhausen is the only municipality located within the park itself. Beyond the villages of the Schönbuchlichtung clearing, other nearby settlements include (in clockwise order) Aichtal, Schlaitdorf, Walddorfhäslach, Pliezhausen, Kirchentellinsfurt, Tübingen, Ammerbuch, Herrenberg, Nufringen, und Gärtringen.

Major parts of Schönbuch are also designated as FFH (Flora, Fauna, and Habitat) areas (No. 7420-341 totaling 11,249 hectares or ~27,797 acres), as well as Special Protection Areas, or SPAs (the EU’s bird reserve program) (No. 7420-441 totaling 15,362 hectares or ~37,960 acres).

The Schönbuch conservation area contains 12,424 hectares (30,700 acres) over the areas of four districts and therefore additionally covers four nature reserve area numbers (1,15,016, 1,16,037, 4,15,009, and 4,16,004). Economic activity in the conservation area is allowed, although restricted.

Numerous natural monuments in Schönbuch enjoy the strictest reserves, such as those in the nature reserves of Eisenbachhain, Grafenberg, Hirschauer Berg, Neuweiler Viehweide, Schaichtal, Schönbuch-Westhang/Ammerbuch, Spitzberg–Ödenburg, and Sulzeiche. Additionally, there are sections within Schönbuch which have even tighter restrictions, called “Bannwäldern” (protected forest) or forest areas with a protected designation, as dictated by the Nature Park Ordinance. In 2001, the Schönbuch Nature Park and adjacent areas were incorporated into the Europe-wide Natura 2000 protected areas network, as the region is home to many rare plants, forest communities, and endangered species.

== History ==
=== The Stone Age and Antiquity ===
Pre- and early-historical traces of human settlement are, different from other forest areas, not rare. The earliest piece of evidence is a blade made of Jura limestone that was found by the Teufelsbrücke (Devil’s Bridge); the dating of this piece to 10,000 B.C. remains uncertain. The residence of the Nomads in the Mesolithic period (8,000 until 5,500 B.C.) is confirmed, since there were living areas found by the Schönbuchtrauf near Herrenberg.

During the Neolithic period, a farming culture with dense residential areas emerged in what is today the fertile area on the border of Schönbuch. The central area of Schönbuch remained undeveloped. The seemingly impenetrable ancient forest was often cleared during the Hallstatt period (880 until 450 BCE) for wood and was further damaged for more forest pastures. One can find 300 Celtic mounds from this period, including a mound in Lehbühl near Schlaitdorf. In the eastern part of Schönbuch are three Celtic rectangular ditched enclosures that can be traced back to the European Iron Age.

Schönbuch was annexed by the Roman Empire in 80 A.D., and evidence from this time gives the impression of a lively marketplace. There were quarries, pottery, and farms. After the Romans withdrew, the Alemannic immigrants initially avoided Schönbuch so the forest could recover from its damaged areas. The reclamation and clearing of Schönbuch started from the north only in the 6th century. Only the central area between Herrenberg and Bebenhausen was never touched, and this area would later make up the center of the unsettled Schönbuch forest.

=== The Middle Ages and Modern Age ===
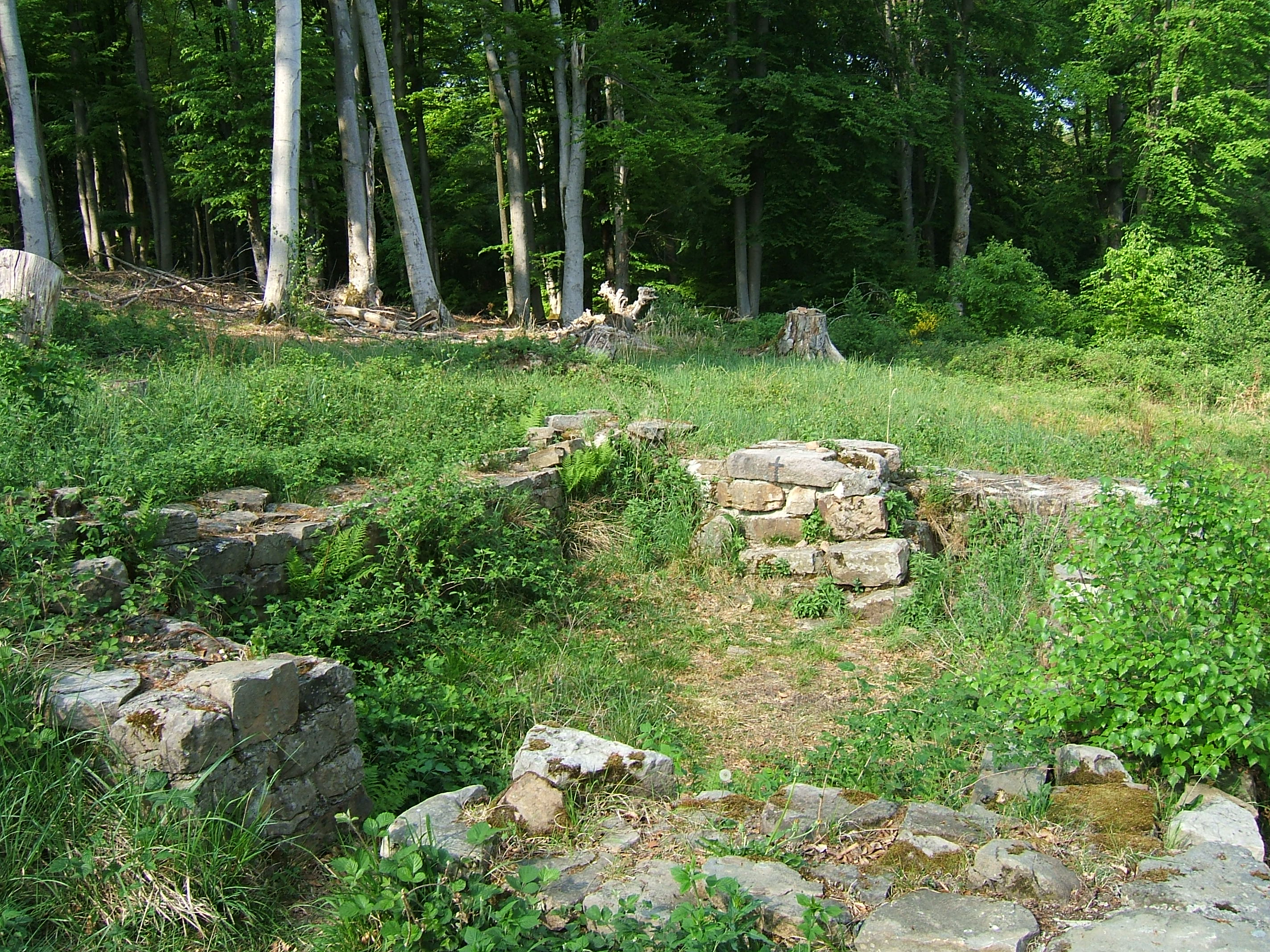
Chapel of the Hermitage with altar on the Bromberg

Chapel of the hermitage with an altar on the Bromberg Hill

In the Early Middle Ages, there were many imperially controlled forests. From the middle of the 12th century, the Palatine counts of Tübingen controlled the majority of the area. The House of Württemberg gained control of Schönbuch in its entirety in the 14th century. The hermitage on Bromberg Hill stemmed from the Late Middle Ages (13th to 15th century). It had been previously considered a chapel. In 1974, the defensive walls of a chapel and a small residential building made of Rhaetian sandstone were exposed. The storm “Lothar” heavily damaged the remains of the hermitage. The remains of the small residential building were restored in 2004 after a contract between the Eberhard Karls University of Tübingen and the state monuments office of Baden-Württemberg.

Schönbuch served as a timber source, woodland pasture (Hutewald), and hunting ground until the 19th century. Hunting was reserved only for the rulers of the House of Württemberg, whereas logging and pasture use were carried out by the so-called Schönbuch comrades (Schönbuchgenossen). This involved around 70 townships and cities in the Schönbuch area, which exchanged money, grain, and chicken in return for the use of the land.

=== Storm Catastrophes ===
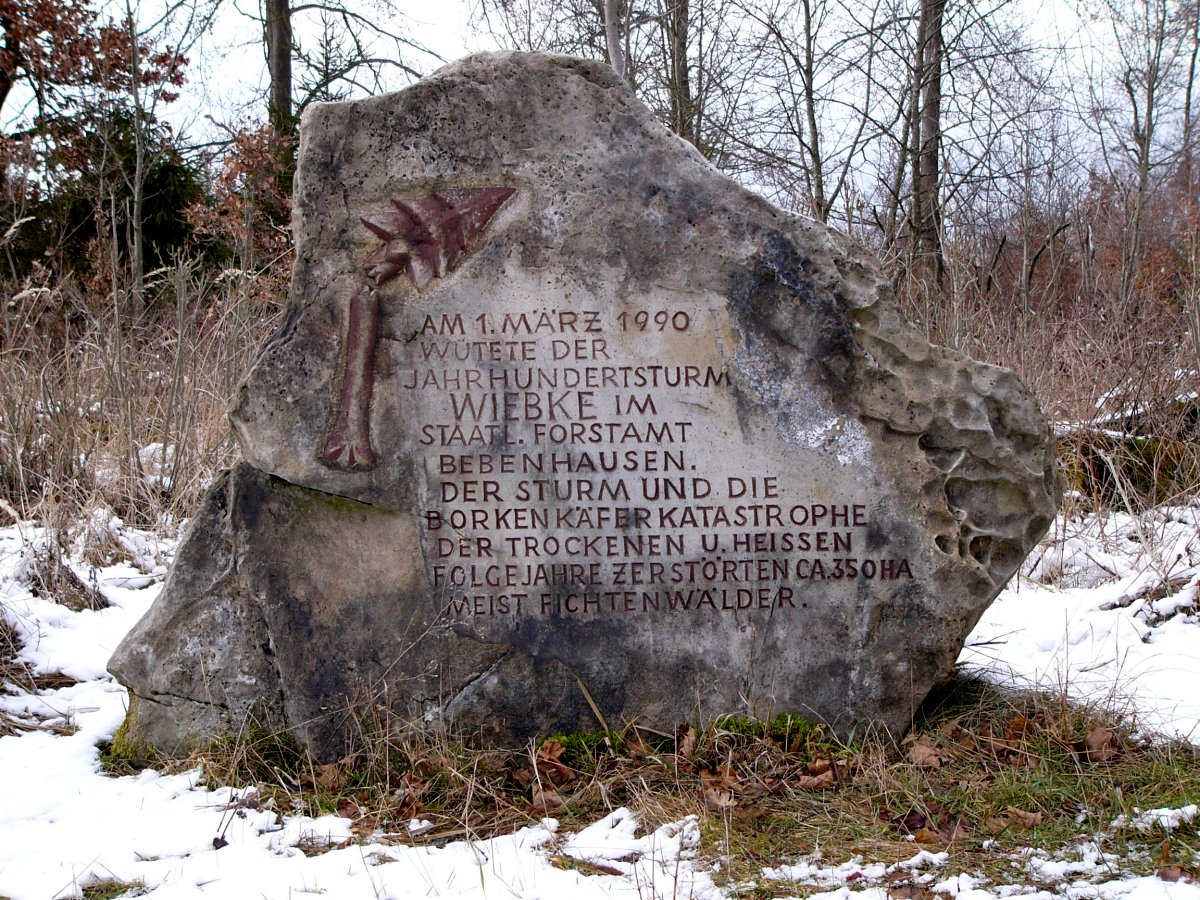
Memorial for Orkan Wiebke on Bromberg

The storms “Vivian” and “Wiebke” in the spring of 1990 caused Schönbuch considerable damage, exacerbated by a subsequent bark beetle plague in the hot and dry years that followed. Nevertheless, “Lothar” surpassed all previous expectations on Boxing Day 1999. While “Wiebke” knocked down the shallow spruces, “Lothar” hit all the trees. A majority of them were knocked down in a domino effect. “Wiebke” toppled over most of the trees together with their roots, whereas “Lothar” simply broke off a good twenty percent, which was also detrimental to the utilization of the wood.

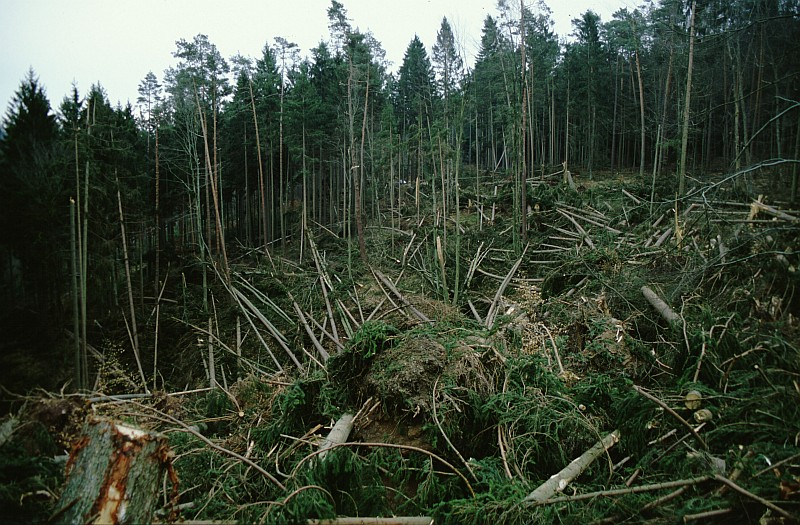
Area of fallen trees from Hurricane "Lothar" in the Arenbach Valley

“Lothar” raged throughout all of the Schönbuch. However, the worst was the western part that was affected. According to previous convictions, younger stormproof trees were damaged. According to calculations of the Forestry Office of Herrenberg, the storm has felled around a third of the entire coniferous forest in its area, and eight percent of the deciduous forest. In the entire Schönbuch, the amount of damage was equivalent to approximately one million cubic meters of timber.

The last storm "Kyrill" in January 2007 caused much less damage compared to the earlier storms. The resulting accumulated storm damage was easily within the normal scope of logging. On the one hand, the reason for the far less dramatic consequences was that “Kyrill” did not develop its full impact in the Schönbuch area. On the other hand, the soil was less soaked than usual.

Today, the damage is also seen as an opportunity to change the composition of the forest to increase the proportion of deciduous tree species. The ecological winners after “Lothar” include many sun-hungry plants and the pioneer tree species – the silver birch – the tree of the year 2000. Nevertheless, it will still take decades until Schönbuch is again at a comparable level before “Lothar.”

== Additional Flora and Fungi ==
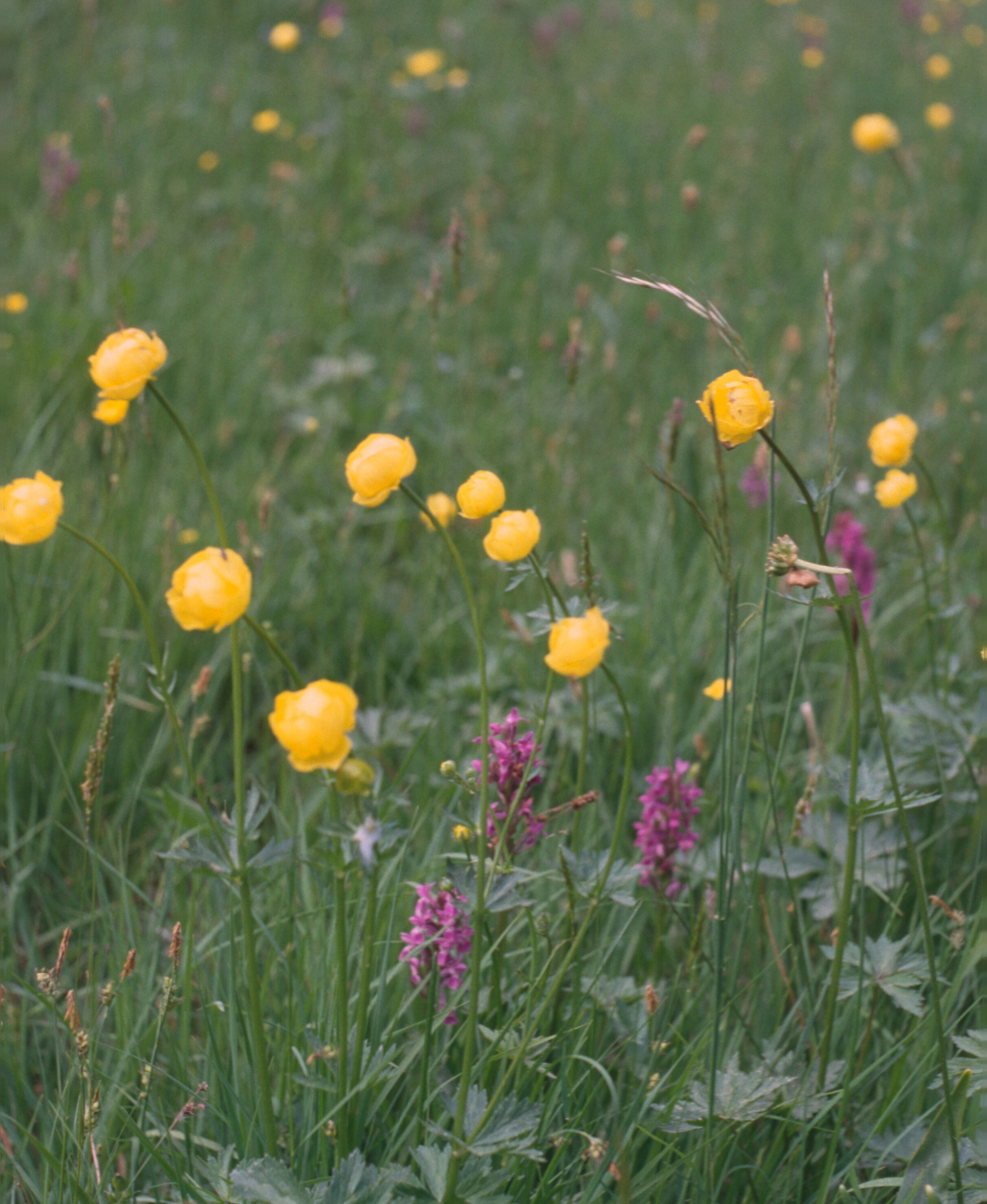
Globeflowers and broad-leaved marsh orchid in the wet meadows of the Kayh Valley

The former intensive utilization of Schönbuch as a woodland pasture and the extraction of leaf litter has caused a nutrient deficiency in many areas, which is valuable from a nature conservation perspective. As a result, plants are provided a refuge that exists only in the park and not in the area around the park. Alone, the narrow and limiting Goldersbach Valley holds over 400 plants and over 90 species of moss.

=== Wet Meadows ===
In the large Goldersbach Valley above the Devil’s Bridge and in the Fishbach Valley and the Lindach Valley, the two source streams of the Goldersbach Valley lead to many wet meadows, which are farmed. The masses of Troll flowers that one can find in the spring are striking. The wet meadows are valuable for orchids.

Today, the meadows are useful for agriculture. To preserve biodiversity and natural succession, they must be mowed once a year. The forestry administration mows the meadows in early summer to prevent bush growth in the valley.

=== Birkensee ===
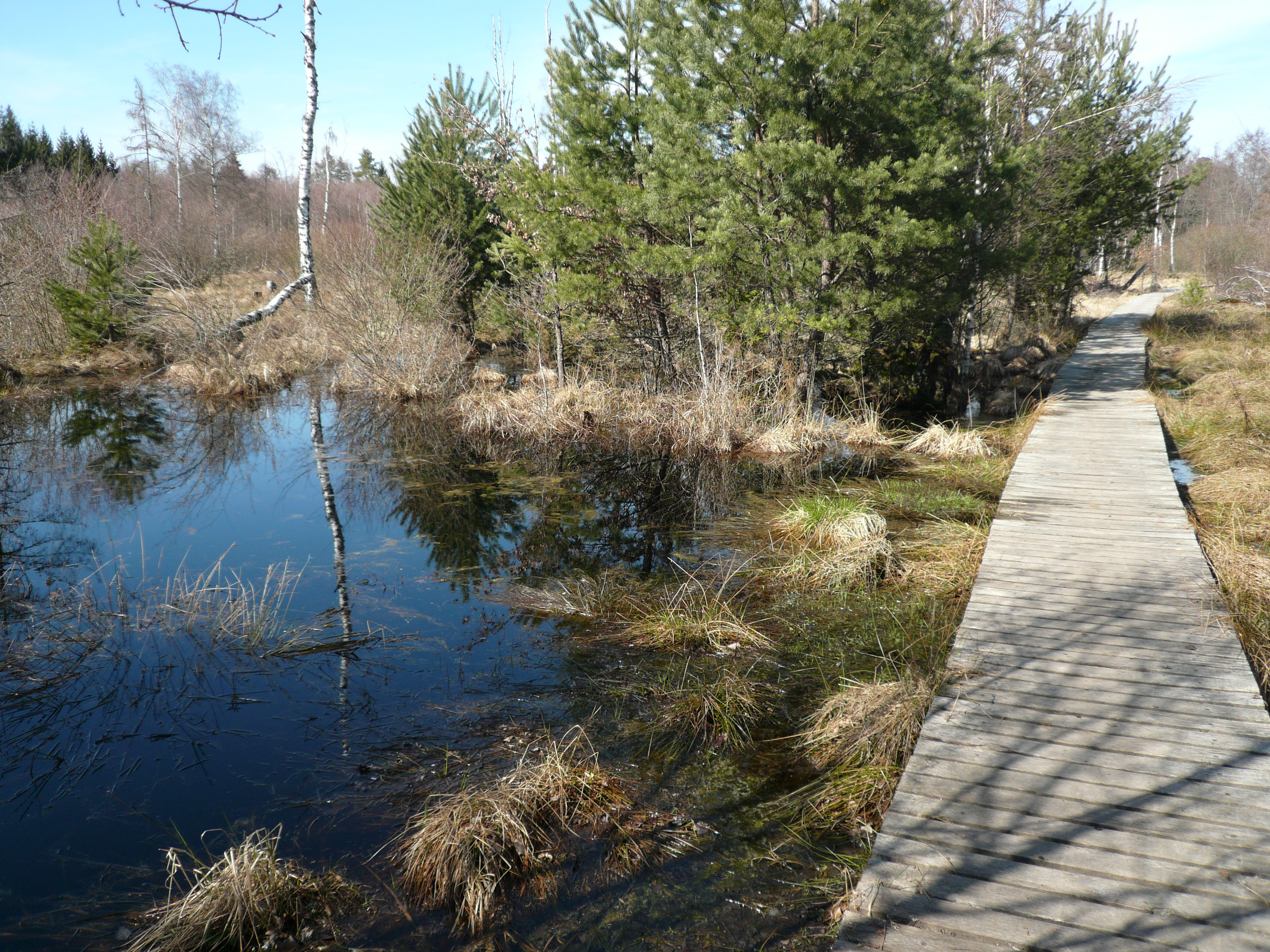
Boardwalk at Birkensee

Stick Dam at Birkensee

On the edge of Bromberg Hill lies Birkensee, a lake which is the location of rare plant communities. It is designated as a natural landmark, and today, the area provides a “transition biome” from a bog to a wetland.

Birkensee allegedly emerged at the beginning of the 19th century in the base of an abandoned sandstone quarry. The bottom of the lake is stabilized by natural cementation; these stone formations have become impermeable to water. A resource from 1667 depicted Birkensee, the lake, but as a swampy prairie instead. Newer research suggests that Birkensee is the last sandbox created during the removal of sticky sand and silver sand in the Bromberg Hill region.

Birkensee has been exposed to more and more silt in recent years. Many of the rare marsh and bog plants that have been recorded previously have now disappeared. Nevertheless, Birkensee still remains one of the most interesting natural areas of Schönbuch. Among other things, one can find Pipe Grass, Red Foxglove, Broombrush, Bracken, Sundew, Narrow-leaved and Broad-leaved Cottongrass, Heather and Carnations, Lycopodium, Bilberries, various Peat Mosses, and, of course, the Birch Trees that give the area its name. To protect the vegetation from trampling by visitors, a boulder dam and other paths made of bark mulch were laid in 1988.

=== Orchards ===
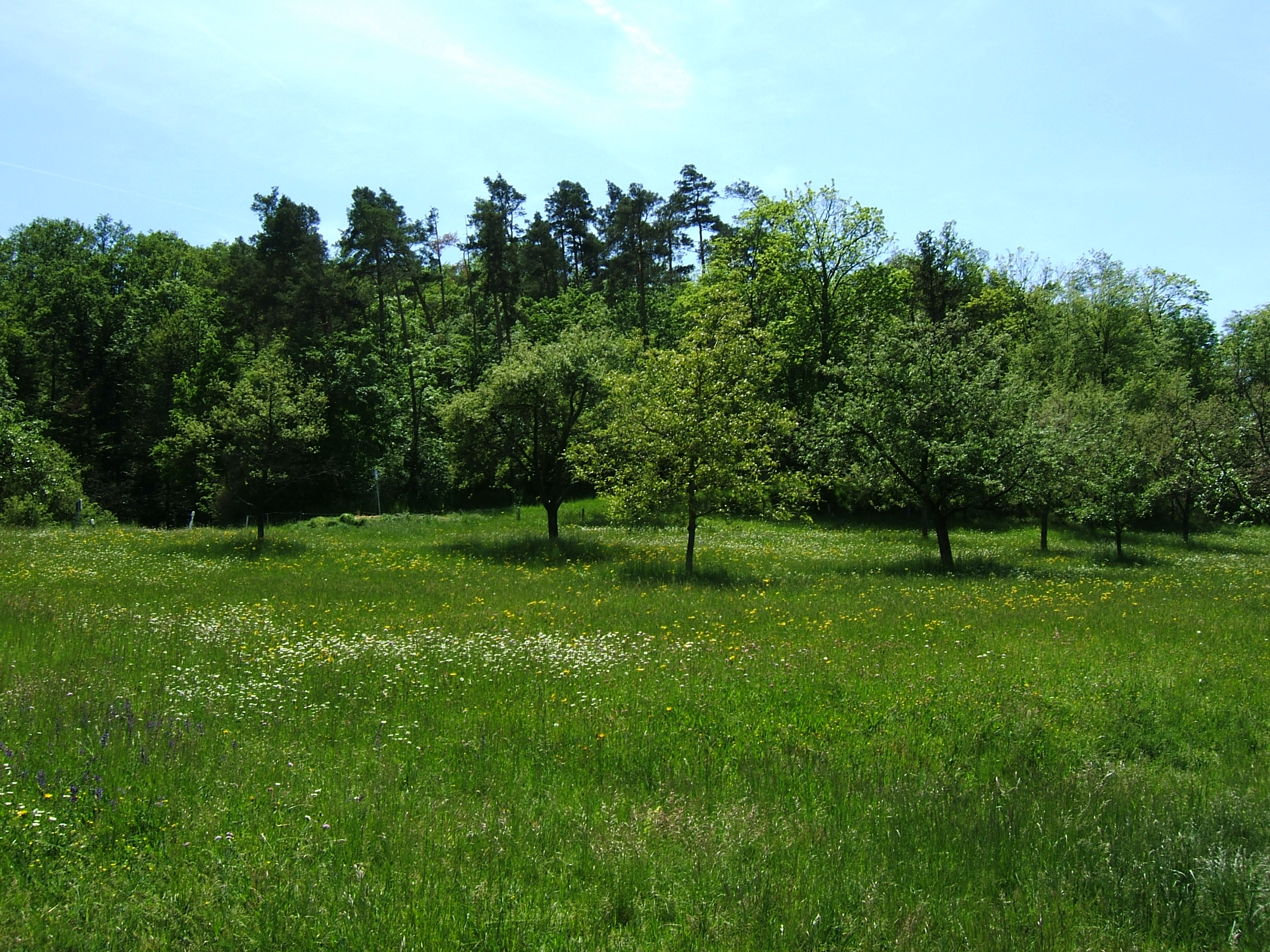
Orchard near Rohrau

The typical form of fruit production in the past was orchards, which are in many places on the edge of the nature park, especially around the western Schönbuch slope. The extensively used meadows have shaped the landscape on the edge of Schönbuch for over 100 years, and today they are of particular importance from an ecological perspective. Around 3000 animal species have been identified in orchards, including 50 breeding birds, some of which are heavily dependent on the habitat as species on the Red List are.

=== Mushrooms ===
The Schönbuch forest, because of its climate conditions and the popularity of trees, is especially suitable for mushrooms. The particularly special mushrooms are the stinkhorn and the dog-tail, the fly agaric, or the octopus stinkhorn, which was introduced and has now established itself. The number of different macrofungi species in the Schönbuch is estimated at about 800, and a large part of them are edible mushrooms. One of the more rare species to mention is the porcini mushroom, but even in the middle of winter, mushrooms such as the velvet foot and the oyster mushroom can be found in the Schönbuch.

== Animals and Hunting ==
Schönbuch, the unsettled nature park, is not only a refuge for plants, but also for animals. Here, there are fire salamanders, yellow-bellied toads, black woodpeckers, and stag beetles, which are animals that have fallen victim to the human-use of land outside of the park.

=== Insects ===
Schönbuch, like other forests, is home to many insects that are useful, such as ants, and harmful, such as bark beetles. The beetles make up the largest proportion of the insect population in Schönbuch; there are thousands of different species. The stag beetle is the biggest in size and also one of the rarest found in Schönbuch; it has found a haven in Schönbuch. The stag beetle, due to its numerosity, is threatened by deforestation of old oaks.

There are also many fireflies that, like many species of butterflies and moths, need clean flowing bodies of water. On the topic of insects, relevant to mention are the fruit orchards on the outer edge of Schönbuch. In this area, 53 species of butterflies, 19 species of orthoptera, and 119 species of wild bees were recorded, the latter 32 of them being on the “Red List” of endangered species. The insects also benefit from the clearings provided by the storms of 1990 and 1999.

=== Mammals ===
Before people settled in the Schönbuch region, other mammals lived in the forest. Since many of the large carnivores became a danger to the settlers and competition for the red deer hunters, the animals were eradicated. The introduction of mammals in the region began with bears in 1600, followed by wolves, lynx, and finally wild cats in 1916.

Today, Schönbuch is still home to quite a large number of mammals. Tübingen scientists have counted 44 mammal species, 40% of which are already classified as endangered. The most common species in the nature park include: the red deer, wild boar, roe deer, badger, red fox, European hare, pine and stone marten, polecat, squirrel, hedgehog, stoat, weasel, mole, dormouse, muskrat, various shrews, and other mouse species.

Schönbuch is well-known for its red deer. Visitors can observe the red deer and wild boars in a specially designed observation enclosure along with special observation points in the park.

Various bat species can also be observed in Schönbuch. In recent years, researchers from the University of Tübingen have detected over ten different bat species. These range from the brown long-eared bat, which lives in the coniferous forest, to the noctule bat and the mouse-eared bat, the largest native species.

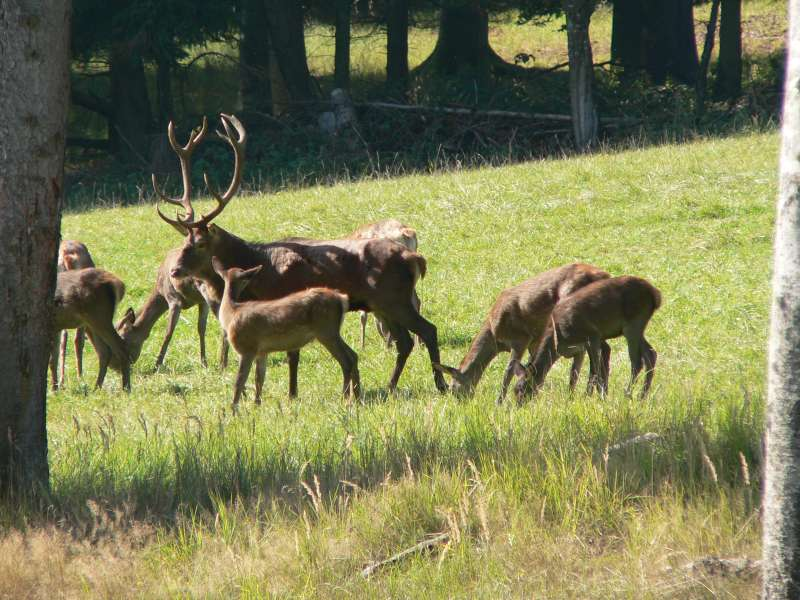
Herd of deer grazing on the Dickenberg pasture

Deer herd on the Dickenberg pasture.

Schönbuch has been home to the red deer for ages. Today, the red deer live in a 15 m² (40 km²) enclosed game reserve that was set up for them in 1959.

Increasing hunting pressure and tourism heavily frightened the animals in Schönbuch that they were rarely found in grazing areas and instead peeled off tree bark in the woods. For the trees to recover from this damage, the original population of 16 deer per square kilometer was reduced to four to five in 1989. Currently, about 150 red deer live in the area.

Today, the wild boar also plays an important and critical role in Schönbuch. Compared to red deer, wild boar are not as bound to their habitat, and the fencing around the red deer habitat is not a significant obstacle for them. During their migration outside the forest, they often cause considerable damage to agricultural land. Roe deer have also benefited from the areas affected by the major storms of 1990 and 1999 and have increased considerably.

Given that the Landesforstverwaltung (“Land Forest Administration”) declared its intent to conserve the red deer in Schönbuch for cultural consideration, five wildlife privacy zones have been added inside the game reserve.

== Recreation and Sport ==
=== Infrastructure ===
There are 560 kilometers of marked hiking trails available in the nature park, only a small portion of which are asphalted. In spring 1998, a new, uniform indication system was installed throughout the entire nature park. This so-called “visitor guidance system” has now been awarded by the Federal Ministry for the Environment.

Visitors also have access to over 100 parking spaces, 38 playgrounds, 84 fireplaces, and 75 shelters. However, on extended hikes through the Schönbuch, you are essentially dependent on self-sufficiency, as the places to stop for refreshments are not particularly numerous and are limited to the outskirts of the nature park, which underlines the originality of a hike. For example, you can stop off at the “castle Hohenentringen,” the “Weiler hut,” the “nature friend house Herrenberg,” and various restaurants in Bebenhausen.

However, one looks in vain for waste containers in the nature park. The rubbish left behind by visitors had become an ecological and financial problem, so the nature park administration had the rubbish bins dismantled some time ago. Visitors are encouraged to take their trash home with them. In 2003, warning signs were put up at critical points such as barbecue areas.

=== Sports ===
In addition to hiking and walking, Schönbuch is also home to many endurance sports. The park is particularly popular among runners, Nordic skiers, walkers, and cyclists. In addition, there are also special trails marked for horseback riding throughout the town.

The large forest area of Schönbuch is ideal for running because it is only intersected by a few roads. Schönbuch is also increasing the events the town holds. The most well-known runs here are the Schönbuch Run, which is over 25 kilometers starting in Hildrizhausen, and the Nikolaus Run, which starts in Tübingen and is over a half marathon in length.

The exercise trails from the fitness craze of the early 1970s are somewhat out of fashion now and are in unsatisfactory condition for working out. In 2005, employees of the park worked with Karls University in Tübingen to try and make the facilities better for the future. It remains to be seen if this project will serve as a model for similar infrastructure in other locations.

=== Nature Trails and Museums ===
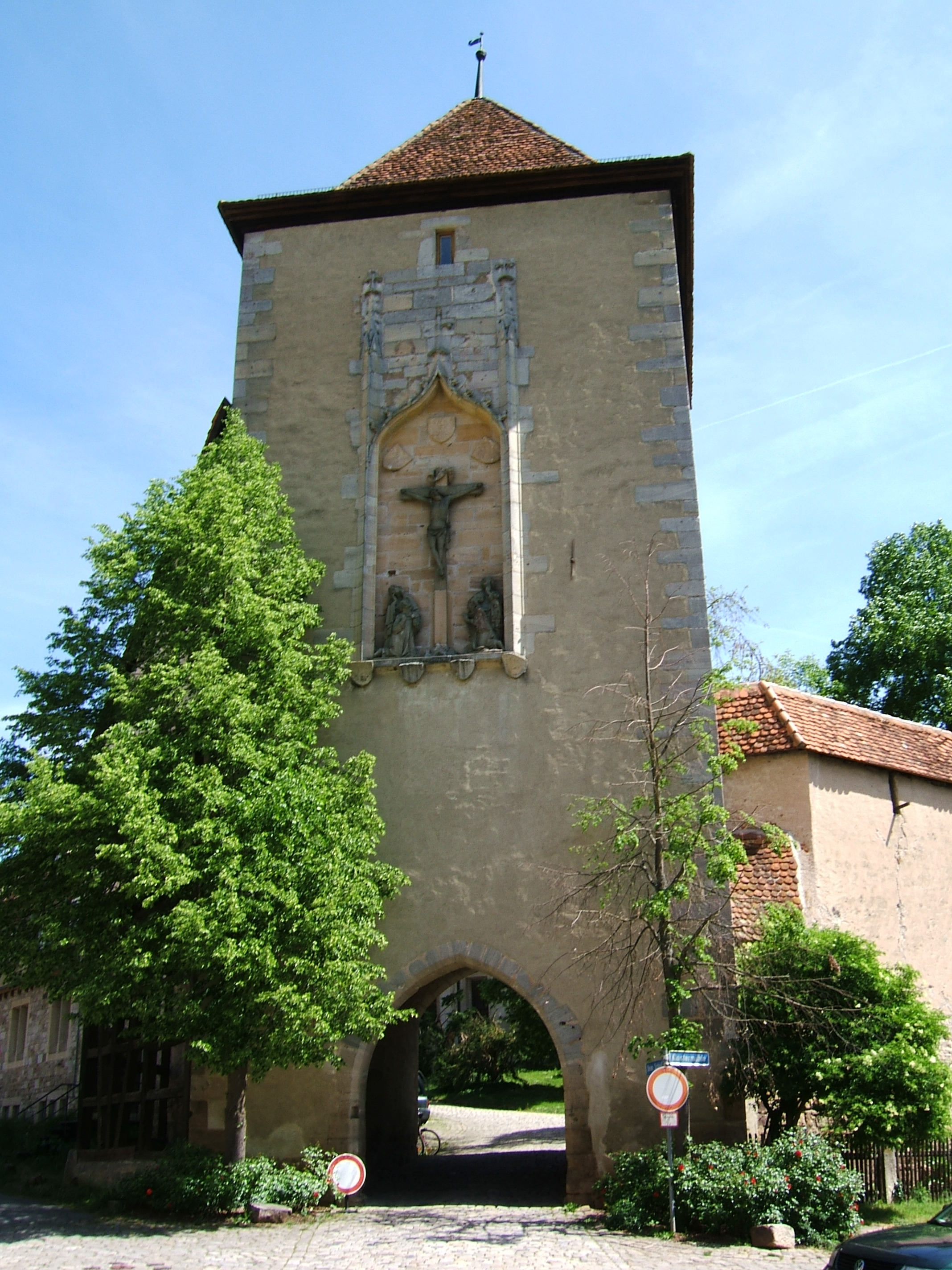
Writing tower of the Bebenhausen Monastery

In addition to the already mentioned Geological Nature Trail in Kirnberg, there are the following nature trails in or around the Schönbuch:

Nature Trail Schlossberg in the Herrenberg City Forest: geology, trees, shrubs, birdlife

Forest Teaching Path Betzenberg: geology, arboretum, birdlife, Stubensandstone quarry

Archaeological-Historical Trail Einsiedel: history from the Hallstatt culture to the past of the Einsiedel Castle, as well as forest and hunting history

Historical Trail Echterdingen: archaeology, geology, local history, forest history

Another way to get more information about the Schönbuch is the Schönbuch Museum in Dettenhausen. It is divided into the following sections:

Stone: geology and the former quarries of the Schönbuch

Forest: the changing history of the forest up to the present

Hunting: courtly hunting, poaching, modern hunting practices

In the writing tower of the former Bebenhausen Monastery, the Nature Park Information Center was also established in 1997. There, the tasks of the nature park, the forest, and its functions are presented in detail and clearly.

== Nature Park Administration and Support Association ==
The oldest nature park in the country, Schönbuch, unlike other nature parks in Baden-Württemberg, has no supporting association and therefore has no income from memberships. The basis of the nature park is on an administrative agreement which was concluded in 1974 and was renewed in 2006. The Nature Park Committee is made of representatives of the surrounding municipalities, the districts, and the state of Baden-Württemberg as the sponsor of the nature park.

As advisors, the Nature Park Committee is assisted by trustees, in which representatives of nature conservation, the regional associations, the Swabian Alb Association, the tourist association, and the agricultural and forestry sectors have voting rights. With the Nature Park administration, the Forestry Directorate Tübingen in Bebenhausen is in charge. The Nature Park Committee and this Board of Trustees together form the Nature Park Board, in which all important decisions for the nature park are made.

The work of the nature park committee is supported by the Friends of Schönbuch Nature Park e. V. (Förderverein Naturpark Schönbuch e. V.), which was founded in 1991. Today, the support association has 260 members, including many private individuals, corporations, companies, hiking, tourism, and history associations. The association doesn’t only carry out public relations work but also undertakes natural history and local history research and performs active landscape conservation measures. For example, the association initiated the uniform signage installed in 1998 and the information center in the writing tower of the Bebenhausen monastery.

== Other ==
At the edge of the forest, there was once the rococo Einsiedel Palace, a hunting lodge of the dukes of Württemberg.

== See also ==
- List of hills of the Schönbuch
