= List of doom metal bands =

This is an alphabetical list of notable doom metal bands as well as bands that play a subgenre or fusion genre of doom metal, such as death-doom or epic doom.

== A ==
- Aarni
- A Pale Horse Named Death
- Abstrakt Algebra
- Acid King (band)
- Acrimony
- Against Nature
- Agalloch
- Ahab
- Alien Boys
- Alice in Chains
- Alkonost
- Amorphis
- Anathema
- Ancestors
- Angel Witch
- Antestor
- Ascending King
- Ashen Mortality
- Ashes You Leave
- Ava Inferi

== B ==
- Bell Witch
- Benea Reach
- Bilocate
- Black Debbath
- Black Sabbath
- Bloody Panda
- The Body
- Bongripper
- Bongzilla
- Boris
- Brainoil
- Burial Chamber Trio
- Burning Witch
- Buzzov*en

== C ==
- Candlemass
- Catacombs
- Cathedral
- Celtic Frost
- Celestiial
- Church of Misery
- Cirith Ungol
- Confessor
- Corrupted
- Conjurer
- Conan
- Count Raven
- Crowbar
- Cryptal Darkness
- Cult of Luna
- Cultic

== D ==
- Danzig
- Daylight Dies
- Deadsy
- Debris Inc.
- Deinonychus
- Dirge
- Disembowelment
- Dolorian
- Doomsword
- Draconian
- Dr Colossus
- Drottnar

== E ==
- Earth
- Earthride
- Electric Wizard
- Elder
- Esoteric
- Eternal Elysium
- Evoken

== F ==
- Faith
- Fall of the Idols
- Floor
- Forest Stream
- Forgotten Tomb
- Funeral

== G ==
- Gallhammer
- The Gates of Slumber
- The Gathering
- Gnaw
- Goatlord
- Goatsnake
- Goblin Cock
- Ghost
- Grand Magus
- Graves at Sea
- Green Carnation
- Green Lung
- Greenmachine
- Grief

== H ==
- Hamferð
- Hangman's Chair
- High on Fire
- The Hidden Hand
- Hooded Menace
- Hour of 13
- How Like a Winter

== I ==
- Internal Void
- Iron Man
- Iron Monkey
- Isis
- Isole

== J ==
- Jesu
- Jucifer

== K ==
- Katatonia
- Khanate
- Khemmis
- Khlyst
- Krux
- KYPCK

== L ==
- Lacrimas Profundere
- Lake of Tears
- Longing for Dawn
- Lyijykomppania

== M ==
- Mael Mórdha
- Melvins
- Memento Mori
- Memory Garden
- Mindrot
- Minotauri
- Minsk
- Mirror of Deception
- Monumentum
- Moonspell
- Morgion
- Morphia
- Mortification
- Moss
- Mournful Congregation
- Mouth of the Architect
- My Dying Bride
- My Shameful

== N ==
- Necare
- Neurosis
- Nortt
- Novembers Doom
- Novembre

== O ==
- The Obsessed
- The Ocean Collective
- October Tide
- Officium Triste
- Old Man Gloom
- Om
- Ophthalamia
- Orange Goblin
- Orodruin

== P ==
- Pallbearer
- Pagan Altar
- Paradise Lost
- Paramaecium
- Pelican
- Penance
- Pentagram
- Place of Skulls
- Planet Gemini
- Pod People
- The Prophecy
- Primitive Man

== R ==
- Ramesses
- Rapture
- Revelation
- Reverend Bizarre
- Rigor Sardonicous
- Runemagick
- Rwake

== S ==
- Sacrilege
- Sahg
- Saint Vitus
- Salem
- Saturnus
- Saviours
- Schaliach
- Seventh Void
- Shape of Despair
- Sheavy
- Silent Stream of Godless Elegy
- Silvertomb
- Six Feet Deep
- Skepticism
- Sleep
- Solace
- Solitude Aeturnus
- Solstice
- Sons of Otis
- Sorcerer
- Soulpreacher
- Spirit Caravan
- Spiritus Mortis
- Sunn O)))
- Swallow the Sun
- The Sword
- Spiral Shades
- Sourvein

== T ==
- Teeth of Lions Rule the Divine
- The Foreshadowing
- Thergothon
- The 3rd and the Mortal
- Thorr's Hammer
- Thou
- Thrones
- Thunderstorm
- Torche
- Triptykon
- Tristitia
- Trouble
- Type O Negative

== U ==
- Unearthly Trance
- Unholy
- Unorthodox

== V ==
- Valhall
- Valkyrie
- Veni Domine
- Virgin Black
- Visceral Evisceration

== W ==
- Warhorse
- Warning
- Weedeater
- While Heaven Wept
- Willard
- Winter
- Witch
- Witchcraft
- Witchfinder General
- Woods of Ypres
- Workshed
- Wreck of the Hesperus
- Wretched

== Y ==
- Yearning
- Yob

== Z ==
- Zaraza
