= Born Too Late Festival =

Born Too Late
- Genre: Doom metal
- Dates: Spring
- Locations: Rochester, NY, United States
- Years active: 2003

Born Too Late was the first all doom metal festival to be held in the USA. It was held in Rochester, New York on April 26, 2003, at The Steel Music Hall. Born Too Late was originally a website dedicated to doom metal music created back in late 1997 by John Gallo of Orodruin, Crucifist, Blizaro.

A repeat festival was planned for August 1, 2009.

== Lineup ==
- Penance
- The Gates of Slumber
- While Heaven Wept
- Revelation
- Soulpreacher
- Orodruin
- Pale Divine
- Unearthly Trance
- 137
