= Internal Void =

American doom metal band

- Origin: Frederick, Maryland, U.S.
- Genres: Doom metal, stoner metal
- Years active: 1987–present
- Labels: Hellhound, Southern Lord, Dogstreet
- Members: J.D. Williams; Kelly Carmichael; Adam Heinzmann; Mike Smail
- Past members: Eric Little; Ronnie Kalimon

Internal Void is an American doom metal band from Frederick, Maryland.

== Biography ==
Internal Void came together in 1987 after Kelly Carmichael, Eric Little and Adam Heinzmann attended a Saint Vitus concert. The band later recruited J.D. Williams as a vocalist and put out two demo recordings in the late 80s/early 90s (Voyage and Smokestack). Hellhound Records picked them up in the early 90s along with several other Maryland doom bands (The Obsessed, Wretched, Unorthodox, Iron Man, Revelation). They had two songs featured on the Hellhound sampler What the Hell! in 1991. In 1993 they released their debut album, Standing on the Sun. This would prompt a nationwide tour with label-mates Saint Vitus. Not much was heard from the band after Hellhound's demise until 2000, when Southern Lord Records released the band's second album, Unearthed, and a split single with Italian doom artist Paul Chain. By this time original drummer Eric Little had been replaced with former Unorthodox drummer Ronnie Kalimon. Kalimon would later be replaced by doom veteran Mike Smail (Cathedral, Dream Death, Penance) and in 2004 the band self-released their latest album, Matricide. Internal Void have appeared on numerous tribute albums, included albums dedicated Saint Vitus, Blue Cheer, and Italy's Death SS.

Carmichael, Heinzmann and Smail all joined Pentagram in 2004 and are featured on Pentagram's album, Show 'Em How.

== Members ==
Current members

- J.D. Williams – vocals (1987–present)
- Kelly Carmichael – guitar (1987–present)
- Adam Heinzmann – bass (1987–present)
- Mike Smail – drums (2004–present)

Former members

- Eric Little – drums (1987–1995)
- Tony Saunders - drums (1995-1996)
- Ronnie Kalimon – drums (1996–2004)

Timeline

== Discography ==
=== Albums ===
- Standing on the Sun – 1992
- Unearthed – 2000
- Matricide – 2004
- Voyage – 2012

=== Singles ===
- "Window to Hell" split 7-inch with – 2000

=== Compilation tracks ===
- "Nothing but Misery" and "Internal Void" on What the Hell! – 1991
- "Blindside" on Metal Injection – 1998
- "Parchman Farm" on Blue Explosion: Tribute to Blue Cheer – 1999
- "Murder Angels" on Beyond the Realms of Death SS – 1999
- "Black Wings of Deceit" on Doom Capital – 2004
- "Prayer for the (M)Asses" on A Timeless Tale – 2004

=== Demos ===
- Unreleased – 1988
- Basement Tapes – 1988
- Voyage – 1991 (official released by Svart Records in 2012 as LP)
