= Flummox =

American band

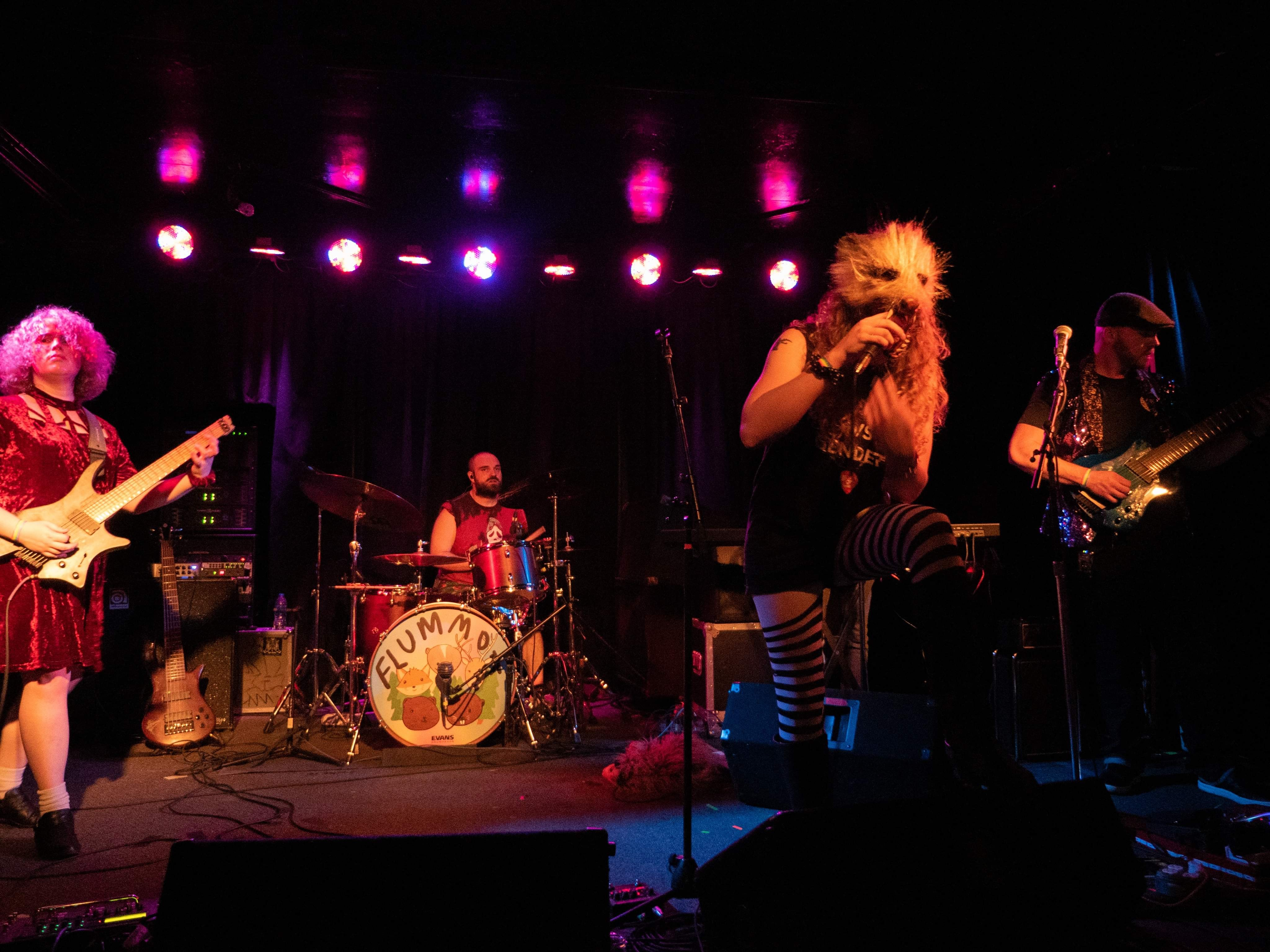
- Flummox performing in Chicago, IL c. 2022

Background information
- Origin: Murfreesboro, Tennessee, U.S.
- Genres: Experimental rock; avant-garde metal; art rock; progressive punk
- Years active: 2012–present
- Labels: Needlejuice; Tridroid; Wood & Stone Productions
- Spinoffs: Edge of Reality, Others by No One, Unorthodox
- Members: Alyson Blake Dellinger; Alan Pfeifer
- Past members: Matt Rose; Jody Lester; Shoney Martin; Justin Smith; Parker Lampley; Drew Jones; Chase McCutcheon; Jesse Peck; Max Mobarry

Flummox is an American experimental rock band from Murfreesboro, Tennessee. The band has changed their sound numerous times, ranging from the progressive metal, psychedelic, and stoner metal styles of their earlier days to avant-garde, extreme metal, sasscore, swing, hardcore, bluegrass, and art rock styles later implemented in their career. Along with genre swapping and unconventional song structures in their music, the band is also known for their theatrical live shows that incorporate comedic skits, musical improvisation, performance art, and audience participation. They have commonly been associated with the queercore movement since the release of their song, "Trans Girls Need Guns."

The band has undergone numerous line-up changes since their formation in 2012. As of 2026, the line-up consists of Alyson Blake Dellinger and Alan Pfeifer.

== History ==
=== Early years (2012–2016) ===
After having played in multiple bands together throughout their teens, Alyson Dellinger and Drew Jones formed the band after graduating high school in the summer of 2012. They chose the name "Flummox" after sifting through several Dr. Seuss books to find a band name and finding a creature called "The Flummox" in If I Ran the Circus. Finding the English definition of the word "flummox" relevant to their sound as well, they decided it would be a good name for their band. Along with local drummer Matt Rose, they recorded their first extended play The Mindrape.P. in August of that year. Catching the ear of Minnesota-based independent record label Tridroid Records, they struck a deal and released their first two records, Phlummoxygen (2014) and Selcouth (2016). During this period, Dellinger and Jones played live shows throughout the southern United States with a few different drummers, primarily operating as a trio with drummer Jody Lester, from 2014 to 2016.

=== Intellectual Hooliganism, signing to Needlejuice (2017–2019) ===
By the beginning of 2017, Flummox had restructured itself as a quartet, with the addition of drummer Alan Pfeifer and guitarist Justin Smith. This line-up would record and release a demo entitled Garage Prog containing four of the songs they wrote for what would become their next record. They would follow this up with their first music video for the song "Tom Walker Blues". The band began touring regionally up and down the south-eastern United States, occasionally opening for bigger acts such as Eyehategod and Chuck Mosley. Expanding upon their sound and stage show, the band brought local musician and haunt actress Parker Lampley into the line-up to perform flute, keyboards, vocals, as well as contortion.

In late 2017, the band began recording their third record, Intellectual Hooliganism. Following the mid-recording departure of Justin Smith, the band recruited guitarist Chase McCutcheon, and the album was released on September 7, 2018, through a local production label, Wood & Stone Productions. This small independent release later caught the attention of Needlejuice Records, who signed the band the following year and subsequently re-released Hooliganism on a double vinyl LP and cassette.

=== Sabbat Worship and In Hindsight EPs, Rephlummoxed (2020–2023) ===
After Parker Lampley took leave of the band, Flummox recruited former Edge of Reality keyboardist and multi-instrumentalist Jesse Peck. In January 2020, this iteration of the band recorded what would become their In Hindsight EP. The following month on February 13, 2020, the band released Sabbat Worship on Needlejuice; an EP featuring three bonus tracks from the Hooliganism sessions. This extended play consisted of an original song and two cover songs (originally by Black Sabbath and Black Widow), with the cover art being a parody of the first Black Sabbath album - released exactly 50 years prior. A small east coast tour was booked to support its release, but was cancelled due to the COVID-19 pandemic. During that summer, they recorded a cover for Nashville Scene's "Nashville Song Swap" as well as dropping the first single from their then-forthcoming Hindsight EP, "Trans Girls Need Guns." Originally appearing on the label's Needlejustice charity compilation to raise money for the NAACP defense fund in midst of the then-recent George Floyd protests, the band made it widely available for streaming on the 51st anniversary of the Stonewall riots. On October 16, 2020, Needlejuice released the second EP, In Hindsight, to general critical acclaim. They followed this release with a live-streamed performance of the entire EP that premiered during Fable Cry's Festival of Ghouls on twitch that Halloween; the following day it was released on their YouTube channel.

While under quarantine, the band decided to continue work on their next venture: a full-length album of re-recorded and rearranged material from their Tridroid releases, entitled Rephlummoxed. Alyson Dellinger and Drew Jones had not been happy with the production of these previous records, so the decision was made to record re-arranged versions of their favorite songs from that era. While finishing the album, Others by No One vocalist and guitarist Max Mobarry joined the band after filling in last minute for Chase McCutcheon after he had fractured his wrist before a show. On April 1, 2022, Rephlummoxed was released on Needlejuice. In support of the album, the band released a lyric video for the first single "Planet Cancer," two animated music videos for the songs "Flummoxing Act 1: Garbonzo's Leap" and "Hummingbird Anthem," and toured multiple times within the United States well into 2023. Throughout some of these shows, Flummox supported bands such as Imperial Triumphant, Sarah and the Safe Word, Daikaiju, You Bred Raptors?, Pentagram, and The Obsessed. During this time, Flummox also recorded a performance for the UK-based High Taste at Home online music festival. The band later released this performance on their YouTube channel that December, and went on to release a remastered version of the set by Angel Marcloid to streaming the following September as Live at Hop Springs.

=== Southern Progress (2024-) ===
In February 2024, Flummox performed a few dates with Orlando-based alt-metal band, Flagman. That spring, they opened for British electronic rock band Enter Shikari at the latter's Nashville tour stop. On July 23, 2024, Flummox announced they would be supporting Black Sabbath parody band Mac Sabbath and Mexican avant-metal band Descartes A Kant on the former band's 10th anniversary tour.

On October 8, 2024, the band premiered the first single and title track for their upcoming album, Southern Progress. Along with unveiling the album artwork, a spring 2025 release window for the record via Needlejuice Records was announced. The album was partially recorded by Jason Dietz (Amigo the Devil, The Tony Danza Tapdance Extravaganza, Hank Williams III) at his Twin Oak studios with vocals and overdubs tracked at Judas Priest guitarist Richie Faulkner’s home studio in Nashville, Tennessee. On November 18, Decibel magazine premiered another single and music video, "Executive Dysfunction." The band simultaneously announced the album pre-order and confirmed a release date of April 11, 2025.

In January 2025 it was announced Flummox would be touring the United States with Mac Sabbath again with California punk bands, The Dickies & Guttermouth on select dates. The following February, Magnet Magazine premiered the music video for another single, “Siren Shock”. On April 11, 2025, Flummox released Southern Progress. In celebration, the band hosted an album release show in their hometown of Murfreesboro, TN. The album was met with mostly positive reviews. August 2026 revealed that Chase McCutcheon, Jesse Peck, and Max Mobarry had all left the band.

== Musical style and stage show ==
The band has primarily used the term "genre-fluid" to describe their music. When interviewed in 2019, Alyson Dellinger described their sound as, “....heavy, weird, theatrical, fusion, thrash rock? Sprinkle in some progressive, psychedelic, swing funk and avant-garde, death/doom jazz?” Austin Weber of No Clean Singing stated, "[they are the] perfect marriage between towering sludge heaviness and powerful psychedelic progressive-rock genius" calling their first album "a modern classic." Natasha Scharf, in an article for Prog magazine, referred to them as "alt-proggers." Metal Injection considered them "difficult to categorize" and said "few if any bands based in sludge and doom get as weird as Flummox do." Revolver remarked that they sounded "...like Slayer with a dash of Protest the Hero-esque prog wonkiness." For Decibel Magazine's Deciblog, Jeff Treppel wrote "[the band] clearly digs Primus, Mr. Bungle, and Mastodon," but added "...despite some fairly obvious influences, they never sound like a straight ripoff." Terrorizer referred to their sound as "Sludge-meets-psychedelic-meets-doom-meets-Monty Python-meets-Motown."

Flummox is also known for their unpredictable and theatrical stage-shows that utilize a variety of props as well as musical improvisation, audience participation, choreographed gags, performance art, and sketch comedy. The complexity and theatrical nature of their stage-show is based on whatever is in their setlist that changes with every show, as Dellinger has a strict rule about "never playing the same set twice." A common bit in their song "Oh, Possum" is for Dellinger to "transform" into an opossum by disappearing behind the stage, returning costumed as the animal, and acting out various traits such as playing dead, jumping into trash cans, and crawling on all fours. Because of this, the band has come to be associated with opossums and often uses the animal as a mascot in their merchandising and overall image. During live performances of their song, "Black Phillip" (a song inspired by plot elements from the 2015 film, The Witch), Dellinger dons a goat mask and performs a mock child sacrifice by cutting open a baby doll full of candy; hand feeding the candy into the mouths of audience members before she tosses the remains of the doll into the crowd.

== Members ==
=== Current members ===
- Alyson Blake Dellinger - lead vocals, bass, piano (2012–present)
- Alan Pfeifer - drums, percussion (2016–present)

=== Past members ===
- Drew Jones - guitars, vocals, keys, trumpet (2012-2022)
- Matt Rose - drums (2012)
- Jody Lester - drums, vocals (2014-2016)
- Shoney Martin - rhythm guitar (2016-2017)
- Justin Smith - guitars, vocals (2017)
- Parker Lampley - keys, flute, vocals (2017-2018)
- Chase McCutcheon - guitars, bass, vocals (2017-2026)
- Jesse Peck - keyboards, vocals (2019-2026)
- Max Mobarry - guitars, vocals, percussion (2021–2026)

=== Past live members ===
- Josh Persinger - drums (2012)
- Joe Myers - drums (2012)
- Jordan Gibson - drums (2013)
- London Allen - drums (2013)
- Kyle Caldwell - drums (2016)
- Keith McQuarrie - alto sax (2018-2019, 2022)
- Jae Deryn Moshen - guitars, vocals (2021)

== Discography ==
=== Studio albums ===
- Phlummoxygen (Tridroid, 2014)
- Selcouth (Tridroid, 2016)
- Intellectual Hooliganism (Wood & Stone, 2018/Needlejuice, 2019)
- Rephlummoxed (Needlejuice, 2022)
- Southern Progress (Needlejuice, 2025)

=== EPs ===
- The Mindrape.P. (self-released, 2012)
- Sabbat Worship (Needlejuice, 2020)
- In Hindsight (Needlejuice, 2020)

=== Singles ===
- "Isabella" (The Blams Blams cover) (self-released/"Nashville Song Swap" 2020)
- "Trans Girls Need Guns" (Needlejuice, 2020)
- "Bad Witch" (Needlejuice, 2020)
- "Flummoxing Act 1: Garbonzo's Leap" (Needlejuice, 2021)
- "Christmas is my Friend" (self-released, 2021)
- "Planet Cancer' (Needlejuice, 2022)
- "Custodian Ralph" (Needlejuice, 2022)
- "Hummingbird Anthem" (Needlejuice, 2022)
- ”Southern Progress” (Needlejuice, 2024)
- ”Executive Dysfunction” (Needlejuice, 2024)
- ”Siren Shock” (Needlejuice, 2025)

==== Live Releases ====
- Manimal's Revenge (2013)
- Live at Hop Springs (2023)

==== Demos ====
- Garage Prog (2017)
