= Sodden Jackal =

EP by The Obsessed
- Released: 1983
- Genre: Doom metal
- Length: 8:39
- Label: Invictus Records

The Obsessed chronology
Sodden Jackal (1983)	The Obsessed (1989)

Sodden Jackal is the title of the debut E.P./single released by doom metal band The Obsessed on 7" vinyl. All three songs from the EP were eventually included on The Obsessed's Incarnate compilation.

A re-recording of the song was released in 2016.

== Track listing ==
No.	Title	Length
1.	"Sodden Jackal"	02:57
2.	"Iron and Stone"	01:29
3.	"Indestroy"	4:13

== Personnel ==
- Scott "Wino" Weinrich - Vocals/Guitar
- Mark Laue - Bass
- Dave The Slave - Drums
