= Incarnate (The Obsessed album) =

Compilation album by The Obsessed
- Released: 1999
- Recorded: 1983–1994
- Studio: Various
- Genre: Doom metal, stoner metal
- Length: 69:47
- Label: Southern Lords
- Producer: The Obsessed, Scott Reeder, Pat Lydon, Rob Schnappf

The Obsessed chronology
The Church Within (1994)	Incarnate (1999)	Sacred (2017)

Professional ratings
Review scores
Source	Rating
AllMusic	3/5 stars
Collector's Guide to Heavy Metal	7/10

Incarnate is a compilation album by American doom metal band The Obsessed. It consists of tracks taken from a number of rare and unreleased sources, namely their Sodden Jackal and Altamont Nation 7"s, the Hellhound Records What the Hell! compilation, and some unreleased demos. There are also two cover songs -- "On the Hunt" (originally by Lynyrd Skynyrd) and "Inside-Looking Out" (originally by The Animals and later covered by Grand Funk Railroad). The track "Streetside" is a video clip.

The album was re-released on double vinyl, digipak CD and digital by Blues Funeral Recordings on October 23, 2020, as part of Record Store Day. All formats included two bonus tracks, demos of "No Blame" and "Neatz Brigade", the final versions of which appeared on the Lunar Womb and The Church Within albums respectively.

== Track listing ==
1. "Yen Sleep" – 4:26
2. "Concrete Cancer" – 3:05
3. "Peckerwood Stomp" – 2:12
4. "Inside-Looking Out" (John Avery Lomax, Alan Lomax, Eric Burdon, Chas Chandler) – 6:17
5. "Mental Kingdom" – 2:55
6. "Sodden Jackal" – 4:15
7. "Iron & Stone" – 2:58
8. "Indestroy" – 1:29
9. "Streetside" – 4:24
10. "Mourning" – 3:54
11. "Spirit Caravan" – 3:09
12. "Skybone" – 4:09
13. "On the Hunt" (Allen Collins, Ronnie Van Zant) – 5:00
14. "River of Soul" (live) – 4:30
15. "Climate of Despair" – 3:04
16. "Decimation" – 4:18
17. "Fears Machine" – 3:40
18. "Field of Hours" – 8:09
19. "Streetside" (video) – 7:32

== Personnel ==
- Scott Weinrich – vocals, guitar
- Scott Reeder – bass
- Guy Pinhas – bass
- Greg Rogers – drums
- Mark Laue – bass
- Dale Crover – drums, background vocals
- Ed Gulli – drums
