= Kohllapse =

Australian musical group

- Origin: Canberra, Australia
- Genres: Gothic-Doom Metal; Darkwave
- Years active: 1996–1999; 2005 – present
- Members: Ro Edwards – (guitars, vocals)
- Past members: Matt Aitchison – (drums, keyboard); Bevan Carroll – (bass); Paul Sweeney – (bass).

Kohllapse is a gothic-doom metal band from Canberra, Australia, formed in the early 1990s. They were well known in the Christian music scene because of the members' beliefs; however, the band developed notoriety within the secular underground metal scene in the 1990s, and were closely followed by the newsportals of the scene throughout the band's career. While Kohllapse released its only two albums independently, their catalogue was distributed widely through Nuclear Blast USA and Blast Beats distribution. The band is notable for its innovative music, which was said to be ahead of its time, that combines darkwave and progressive doom metal, and the fact that they became significantly well known in both secular and Christian metal scenes. Distant Mind Alternative was their most popular and critically acclaimed album, and has been re-issued by Soundmass in 2005. The band mainly consisted of guitarist-vocalist Ro Edwards and drummer-keyboardist Matt Aitchison. After Aitchison left in 1999 the band split up in 2001.

== Biography ==
Kohllapse was formed by guitarist-vocalist Ro Edwards and drummer-keyboardist Matt Aitchison in the early 1990s as a death metal band. By the mid 1990s, just like many other former death metal groups, Kohllapse began developing their sound away from its roots to more experimental direction.

In the year 1995, the band began independently recording its first album, originally intended as a promotional CD. The band released Kohllapse in 1996. It was noted for its exceptionally dark and varied track listing that combined death, doom, gothic and electronic elements. One song, "An End to Pain" features black metal type output. Kohllapse was chosen as the "Pick of the Litter" in HM Magazine March–April issue in 1997, and was described as "the first Christian band that sounds like Type O Negative". The song "Tell Me Your Fears" was released on the magazine's sampler in 1998.

After the release, the Christian metal scene press began to follow the band's career, and reported any updates given in interviews or Kohllapse's website. Since Kohllapse are an Australian band, the European and United States labels were uncertain whether to sign the band, and the Australian labels could not sign a studio project group, thus the band remained unsigned. However, they got a distribution deal with a Texas, United States based Blast Beats music seller, which distributed the album further. The album received positive notice: in 1997 they began receiving major label interest, and in 1998 the band signed a distribution deal with Nuclear Blast USA.

This distribution deals helped Kohllapse to reach new fans all over the world. During this time, few bassists joined and left the band, Bevan Carroll was one of them. Kohllapse played a number of concerts during their active years and supported the UK doom act Cathedral Cathedral when they played in Canberra.

In 1999, Paul Sweeney joined as a bassist, and the band recorded and released Distant Mind Alternative, their darkest, doomiest and most atmospheric album. The album introduced a more mellow and somber direction with more emphasis on dark electronical sounds. Edwards switched his vocals to deeper baritone singing in contrast with the previous death grunt style. Distant Mind Alternative was distributed through Nuclear Blast, and achieved rave reviews and critics called it innovative for its style that combined darkwave with doom metal. Annie Marootians did some female vocals on the song "Contort". A music video was shot for "Thorn", and was released on Heaven's Metal Video Magazine Volume 6 VHS. Soon, underground magazines began to call Kohllapse as one of the big names in Australian doom scene together with Paramaecium and Avrigus. However, Aitchison left Kohllapse after the release.

According to Edwards, after the release of Distant Mind Alternative, some notably big secular labels showed serious interest towards Kohllapse, but since Aitchison had left at a crucial point in the band's career, to pursue his own musical interests, the band could not sign a contract.

After 2 years of silence, Ro Edwards officially announced the end of Kohllapse in 2001.

In 2005 the Australian label, Soundmass, reissued Distant Mind Alternative. Afterwards, it has been recognized as a masterpiece.

in 2021 Ro Edwards began releasing demos of a solo project called Azmorean, marking a return from a near 20-year hiatus from releasing any music publicly.

== Music ==
Kohllapse's music combines a variety of different melancholic doom genres including atmospheric doom, melodic doom-death, gothic-doom, melodic doom-black and funeral doom. Influences range from My Dying Bride to Dolorian and Katatonia to Circle of Dust. Their sound was mostly compared to Anathema or Paradise Lost. The band's trademark is the strong darkwave an industrial element on songs like "Real Man in Quicksand". Although they incorporate strong gothic influences, Kohllapses music has also been labeled simply as a very dark brand of progressive metal. However, their music is often dubbed gothic metal. Edwards' vocal patterns on the last album are said to be reminiscent of Peter Steele (Type O Negative) while he incorporates some extreme vocals.

== Discography ==
- Kohllapse (1996)
- C.Y.E demo (1997)
- Distant Mind Alternative (1999)
