= Daikaiju (disambiguation) =

Daikaiju is a Japanese term meaning "giant strange beast" or "great strange beast".

Daikaiju may also refer to:

- Daikaiju (band), an American surf rock band
- Daikaijū Gamera, a 1965 Japanese kaiju film
- Daikaijū Monogatari, a 1994 role-playing video game
- Daikaijū no Gyakushū, a 1986 shoot 'em up arcade game
