= Thunderstorm (disambiguation) =

A thunderstorm is a storm characterized by the presence of thunder and lightning.

Thunderstorm may also refer to:

- Thunderstorm (band), a heavy metal band
- Thunderstorm (album), a 2000 album by Iron Fire
- Thunderstorm (film), a 1956 British drama film
- Thunderstorm (play) or Lei Yu, a 1933 play by Cao Yu
- Thunderstorm (opera) or Lei Yu, a 2001 Chinese-language western-style opera by composer Mo Fan based on Cao Yu's play
- The Thunderstorm or Lei Yu, a 1957 Hong Kong film co-starring a young Bruce Lee in a non-fighting role
- "Thunderstorm" (Peppa Pig), a 2004 television episode
- Thunderstorms and Neon Signs, a 1995 album by Wayne Hancock
- Thunder Storm, a 1984 arcade video game known as Cobra Command outside Japan

== See also ==
- Electrical storm (disambiguation)
- Storm (disambiguation)
- Thunder (disambiguation)
