= Spiral Shades =

Doom metal band

- Origin: India; Norway
- Genres: Doom metal; Hard rock; Stoner Rock
- Years active: 2012-present
- Label: RidingEasy
- Members: Khushal Bhadra; Filip Petersen
- Website: https://spiralshades.bandcamp.com

Spiral Shades is a doom metal band formed in 2012, involving songwriter, vocalist Khushal Bhadra and Filip Petersen(Guitarist) from India, Mumbai City and Norway Vennesla respectively. Both individuals love playing music and draw inspiration from the 1970s era, which got them together virtually to form a band called Spiral Shades. Their biggest influences are bands like Black Sabbath, Pentagram (band), Opeth, The Obsessed, Electric Wizard.

== Biography ==
The band was formed by Khushal Bhadra when one fine day looking for someone with similar musical taste he stumbled upon Filip Petersen's YouTube channel where he used to record guitar covers of rare underground bands. This immediately sparked some conversation between the two and the love for this genre of music. This led to further discussions and creation of their debut demo titled ‘Hypnosis Sessions’.

Since the two of them were thousands of miles away from each other it took some time to get used to creating music online. They faced issues recording the drums; eventually it had to be programmed because it was a difficult task to arrange for a drummer recording remotely.

With little to no knowledge about releasing music and several budget constraints they somehow managed to release their demo online through Bandcamp, iTunes, SoundCloud, Facebook etc.

Their demo ‘Hypnosis Sessions’, released on 15 August 2013 was well received by the underground doom metal community and was critically acclaimed for its musicianship. After some success of their demo release they were signed by an indie record label from US called Easyrider Records(now RidingEasy Records).

The record label re-released their original demo ‘Hypnosis Sessions’ somewhere around April 2014 by remixing and re-mastering their songs. Post their debut album Spiral Shades released an EP ‘Children of Doom’ in October 2015 featuring covers of artists that have influenced them as musicians including Bobby Liebling and Scott Weinrich.

Their second album 'Revival' was released digitally on Bandcamp somewhere around September 2023, Their lineup being the same as before, Khushal doing the vocals and writing the lyrics, while Filip doing all the instruments. This release was mixed and mastered by Maxim Losch from Redville Studio, with the album artwork created by Matt Ashurst from Muse Dealer Studio.

== Discography ==
=== Albums ===
- Hypnosis Sessions LP/CD (RidingEasy Records 2014)
- Revival Online (Self Released 2023)

=== EPs ===
- Children of Doom Online (Self Released 2015)
