= Planet Gemini =

Planet Gemini may refer to:

- Planet Gemini (band), an American doom metal band
- Planet Gemini (album), a 1997 album by Michael Angelo Batio
- Gemini PDA, a personal digital assistant designed by Planet Computers

== See also ==
- Gemini (disambiguation)
