= The Church Within =

Studio album by The Obsessed
- Released: 1994
- Studio: Alpha & Omega Recording, San Rafael and SPL Studios, Van Nuys, California
- Genre: Doom metal, heavy metal, stoner metal
- Length: 48:25
- Label: Hellhound, Columbia
- Producer: M.C. Snoob and The Obsessed

The Obsessed chronology
Lunar Womb (1991)	The Church Within (1994)	Incarnate (1999)

Professional ratings
Review scores
Source	Rating
AllMusic	4/5 stars
Collector's Guide to Heavy Metal	8/10

The Church Within is the third studio album by American metal band The Obsessed. It was released in 1994 by Columbia Records and Hellhound Records, and was their final album before their 16-year breakup from 1995 to 2011. Columbia Records released two promo singles to support the album, "Streetside"/"Blind Lightning" and "To Protect and to Serve"/"Mental Kingdom".

The album was reissued on CD and 2LP in 2013 on Real Gone Music with unseen photos, liner notes, and two bonus tracks from the same sessions in 1994.

== Track listing ==
All lyrics written by Scott "Wino" Weinrich, all music by the Obsessed

1. "To Protect and to Serve" – 3:05
2. "Field of Hours" – 5:38
3. "Streamlined" – 2:09
4. "Blind Lightning" – 3:39
5. "Neatz Brigade" – 6:49
6. "A World Apart" – 1:32
7. "Skybone" – 3:50
8. "Streetside" – 3:25
9. "Climate of Despair" – 3:04
10. "Mourning" – 4:05
11. "Touch of Everything" – 4:37
12. "Decimation" – 4:08
13. "Living Rain" – 2:24
14. "Mental Kingdom" – 2:54 (1994 version, bonus track on 2013 edition)
15. "Melancholy Grey" – 3:03 (1994 version, bonus track on 2013 edition)

== Personnel ==
- Scott "Wino" Weinrich – vocals and guitar
- Guy Pinhas – bass
- Greg Rogers – drums

Production

- Mathias Schneeberger (M.C. Snoob) – producer, engineer
- Curt Kroeger, Gregg Schnitzer, Pat Lydon, Terry Weeks – assistant engineers
- Joshua Sarubin – executive producer
