= Kohllapse (album) =

Studio album by Kohllapse
- Released: 1996
- Genre: Gothic-Doom; Darkwave
- Length: 43:51
- Label: Self-Released

Kohllapse chronology
Kohllapse (1996)	Distant Mind Alternative (1999)

Kohllapse is the self-titled debut full-length album by the Australian group Kohllapse.

== Recording history ==
In 1995, the band began independently recording this album, originally intended as a promotional CD. The band released Kohllapse in 1996. It was noted for its exceptionally dark and varied track listing that combined death, doom, gothic and electronic elements. The song "An End to Pain" features black metal type out put with its buzzsaw guitars and shrieking vocals.

Kohllapse was chosen as the "Pick of the Litter" in HM Magazine's March/April issue in 1997, and was described as "the first Christian band that sounds like Type O Negative". The song "Tell Me Your Fears" was released on the magazine's sampler in 1998.

In 1997 the band signed a distribution deal with Nuclear Blast USA, making the album available for wider audience.

== Track listing ==
1. "Path" – 1:27
2. "Tell Me Your Fears" – 10:36
3. "Never" – 7:12
4. "Towards" – 1:03
5. "Take Me Away" – 4:09
6. "My Child" – 4:49
7. "An End to Pain" – 2:29
8. "Self Infliction" – 7:55
9. "Serenity" – 4:11
