= Distant Mind Alternative =

Studio album by Kohllapse
- Released: 1999; 2005
- Genre: Gothic-Doom; Darkwave
- Length: 56:56
- Label: Self-Released; Soundmass

Kohllapse chronology
Kohllapse (1996)	Distant Mind Alternative (1999)

Soundmass Edition Cover

Distant Mind Alternative is the second full-length album by the Australian group Kohllapse, released in 1999.

== Recording history ==
While the album was originally self-released, Distant Mind Alternative was distributed through Nuclear Blast USA. A musicvideo was shot for "Thorn", and was released on HM Magazine's Heaven's Metal Video Magazine Volume 6 VHS.

Musically, Distant Mind Alternative is darker, doomier and more atmospheric than the self-titled album. The album introduced a more mellow and somber direction with more emphasis on dark electronical sounds. The album incorporates strong darkwave an industrial elements on songs such as "Real Man in Quicksand". Ro Edwards switched his vocal out put to a more deeper baritone singing in contrast with the previous death growl style. Edwards' vocal patterns on this album are said to be reminiscent of those of Peter Steele (Type O Negative) while he also incorporates some extreme vocals. Annee Marootians did some female vocals on the song "Contort".

Distant Mind Alternative achieved rave reviews and critics called it innovative for its style that combined darkwave with doom metal.

It was re-released in 2005 by Soundmass.

== Track listing ==
1. "Thorn" - 5:19
2. "Real Man in Quicksand" - 5:28
3. "Seven" - 7:51
4. "Gravitation" - 5:47
5. "Ghost storm" - 4:02
6. "Eclipse" - 7:27
7. "Contort" - 7:13
8. "Deep blue" - 5:47
9. "Insight" - 6:26
10. "Hidden Track" - 1:35
