= Minotauri =

Finnish doom metal band

- Origin: Äänekoski, Finland
- Genres: Doom metal
- Years active: 1995–2007
- Labels: Black Widow, Spinefarm
- Past members: Tommi Pakarinen; Viljami Kinnunen; Ari Honkonen

Minotauri was a doom metal band from Finland. Alongside Reverend Bizarre and Spiritus Mortis they were one of the most important bands in the Finnish true doom metal movement. The band was formed in 1995 and disbanded in 2007.

== Discography ==
=== Singles ===
- "Pain of Life/Violence" (2002) – 7"; Iron Bonehead Productions
- "Devil Woman" (2000) – demo; self-released
- "Minotauri/Reverend Bizarre" (2004) – 7"; Metal Coven
- "Satan In Man/Sex Messiah" (2004) – 7"; I Hate Records

=== Albums and EPs ===
- Doom Metal Invasion (2002) – EP; Iron Bonehead Productions
- Funeralive (2002) – live album; self-released
- Minotauri (2004) – album; Black Widow Records
- II (2007) – album; Firebox Records

== Band members ==
- Ari Honkonen - vocals, guitar
- Tommi Pakarinen - bass
- Viljami Kinnunen - drums
