= Penance (band) =

American doom metal band

- Origin: Pittsburgh, Pennsylvania, U.S.
- Genres: Doom metal
- Years active: 1990–2004
- Labels: Rise Above, Century Media
- Members: Brian Balich; Terry Weston; Matt Tuite; Mary Bielich; Mike Smail
- Past members: Brian Lawrence; Lee Smith; Richard Freund; Frank Miller; Ron Leard; Dave Roman

Penance was an American doom metal band from Pittsburgh, Pennsylvania.

== Biography ==
Penance was formed after the demise of Dream Death, when several members decided to pursue a more traditional doom direction. Dream Death existed during mid eighties and played a mixture of doom, hardcore and thrash metal.

Founders of Penance were drummer Mike Smail and guitarist Terry Weston (both previously members of Dream Death) and they were the core of the band from its early days to the disbanding. The band changed various line-ups, and one of their most notable members was Mary Bielich (Novembers Doom).

Penance's debut The Road Less Travelled, featuring Brian Lawrence (who was also previously a member of Dream Death) on vocals and guitar, was released 1992, under Lee Dorrian's label Rise Above Records. Alongside with Revelation's debut, it was a first doom metal album released on this label. They embarked on a European tour in support of Cathedral and Sleep.

Their second album, Parallel Corners, was released 1994, by the European metal label Century Media. Many fans consider this the band's best album, and it is also considered one of the classics of 1990s (traditional) doom metal. On the next releases Penance adopted a slight range of psychedelic influences, but still remained fairly closed to their traditional doom roots.

Spiritualnatural (2003) was the band's final album. They embarked on a European tour in 2004 partnered with Well of Souls and Orodruin. They split that same year. The Road Revisited was released in 2005, which is the unreleased original recorded version of the first album.

Mike Smail went on to join Internal Void and doom pioneers Pentagram.

== Discography ==
=== Albums ===
- The Road Less Travelled – 1992
- Parallel Corners – 1994
- Proving Ground – 1999
- Alpha and Omega – 2001
- Spiritualnatural – 2003
- The Road Revisited – 2005

=== Demos/EPs ===
- Living Truth – 1990
- Bridges to Burn – 1998
