= Orodruin (band) =

American doom metal band

- Origin: Rochester, New York, U.S.
- Genres: Doom metal, heavy metal, traditional doom metal
- Years active: 1998–present
- Labels: Cruz Del Sur, psycheDOOMelic, Hellride
- Members: John Gallo; Nick Tydelski; Mike Puleo; Randy Rowe
- Past members: Mike Waske
- Website: orodruin.bandcamp.com

Orodruin is an American doom metal band from Rochester, New York, who play traditional doom as part of the style's early-2000s revival, playing alongside bands like Reverend Bizarre, While Heaven Wept, and Penance. Their sophomore release Ruins of Eternity came out on Cruz Del Sur Records on October 25, 2019.

Orodruin began in 1998, bridging their love for Tolkien with doom metal with influences like Saint Vitus, Candlemass, Cathedral, Trouble and Black Sabbath. In its primal stages John Gallo (then singer/guitarist), cousin Nick Tydelski (guitar) and best friend Mike Puleo (guitar) recorded an early demo in late 1998/1999. It was recorded with engineer Sebastian Marino (Overkill) at Audio Images and hired drummer Rob Mount (Ramrod, Lou Graham Band). In 2001 they found full time drummer Mike Waske and Mike Puleo switched to bass/vocals. Their sound cultivated with new material more in line to traditional doom metal. The first full-length album, Epicurean Mass, was released on Mark Hegedus' psycheDOOMelic label out of Vienna, Austria, in spring 2003.

In 2003, they embarked on their first U.S. tour in support of Epicurean Mass as part of the Doomination Tour alongside The Prophecy (England) and Mourning Beloveth (Ireland).

In 2004, they released a split 12" on Chris Barnes' Hellride Music Label and put out an EP on PsycheDOOMelic called Claw Tower and other Tales of Terror and went on a European tour with Penance in spring of that year. With both bands playing Doom Shall Rise 2 in Göppingen, Germany.

Mike Waske left in 2018 so Mike Puleo filled in on drums for their sophomore album "Ruins of Eternity". In 2019 Kevin Latchaw (Argus) lent his drumming for the Hammer of Doom XIV festival in Würzburg, Germany, and a few local shows in Rochester, New York. In 2022, they recruited local Rochester drummer Randy Rowe (Haishen) to officially join the band.

Members of Orodruin are closely associated with other contemporary doom acts such as The Gates of Slumber, Revelation, Iron Man, Blood Ceremony, and Argus.

== Members ==
- Mike Puleo – bass, vocals, studio drums
- Nicholas Tydelski – guitar
- John Gallo – guitar
- Randy Rowe - Drums

=== Former members ===
- Mike Waske – drums

== Discography ==
=== Albums ===
- Epicurean Mass (2003, PsycheDOOMelic Records)
- Ruins of Eternity (2019)

=== EPs ===
- Claw Tower and Other Tales of Terror (compilation, 2004, PsycheDOOMelic Records)
- In Doom (2012, independent)

=== Splits ===
- Orodruin/Reverend Bizarre (2004, Hellride Music)
- Altar of Worship (2025, Nameless Grave Records) with Iron Void
