= The Obsessed (album) =

Studio album by the Obsessed
- Released: 1990
- Recorded: 1985
- Studio: Ambient Studios, College Park, Maryland
- Genre: Doom metal, stoner metal
- Length: 32:37
- Label: Hellhound
- Producer: Scott "Wino" Weinrich

The Obsessed chronology
The Obsessed (1990)	Lunar Womb (1991)

Reissue cover

Professional ratings
Review scores
Source	Rating
AllMusic	3/5 stars
Collector's Guide to Heavy Metal	7/10

The Obsessed is the debut album by American metal band the Obsessed, released in 1990 by Hellhound Records. All songs were recorded in 1985 for an intended album for Metal Blade Records, which had never been released. The release of this album prompted singer Scott "Wino" Weinrich to leave Saint Vitus and reform the Obsessed with a new rhythm section.

The album was re-released by Tolotta Records in 2000 with new artwork and 10 live bonus tracks recorded at Glenmont Rec. Center in Wheaton, Maryland, on February 25, 1984.

It was re-released again on November 17, 2017, by Relapse Records with a slightly updated version of the original artwork. The CD version came with a bonus disc that included the 1984 demo Concrete Cancer, as well as a concert recorded "Live at the Bayou" in Washington, D.C., on April 15, 1985.

== Track listing ==
All songs written by Scott Weinrich, except where noted.

1. "Tombstone Highway" – 3:29
2. "The Way She Fly" – 2:22
3. "Forever Midnight" – 4:59
4. "Ground Out" – 3:17
5. "Fear Child" – 1:53
6. "Freedom" – 5:58
7. "Red Disaster" (Weinrich, Mark Laue) – 3:52
8. "Inner Turmoil" – 2:21
9. "River of Soul" – 4:26

2000 reissue live bonus tracks:

1. "No Message" – 1:03
2. "Neatz Brigade" – 4:54
3. "Concrete Cancer" – 3:13
4. "Mental Kingdom" – 2:49
5. "Feelingz" – 2:26
6. "A World Apart" – 1:45
7. "Freedom" – 5:04
8. "Blind Lightning" – 3:45
9. "Indestroy" – 1:47
10. "Kill Ugly Naked" – 2:07

2017 reissue bonus disc:

1. Concrete Cancer (Demo) – 3:02
2. Feelingz (Demo) – 2:11
3. Mental Kingdom (Demo) – 2:50
4. Hiding Masque (Demo) – 3:31
5. Ground Out/Feelingz (Live) – 5:07
6. Concrete Cancer (Live) – 3:10
7. No Blame (Live) – 2:43
8. Mental Kingdom (Live) – 2:59
9. Tombstone Highway (Live) – 3:13
10. Iron and Stone (Live) – 3:27
11. River of Soul (Live) – 3:58
12. Sittin' on a Grave/I Don't Care (Live) – 4:47
13. Freedom (Live) – 5:52
14. Indestroy/Kill Ugly Naked (Live) – 3:29

== Personnel ==
- Scott "Wino" Weinrich – vocals and guitar, producer
- Mark Laue – bass
- Ed Gulli – drums

Production

- Ray Tilkens – engineer
- Mathias Schneeberger, Stephan Gross – mixing at Vielkang Studio, Berlin
