= Lunar Womb =

Studio album by The Obsessed
- Released: 1991
- Recorded: 1991
- Studio: Powerplay and Vielklang Studios, Berlin, Germany
- Genre: Doom metal, heavy metal, stoner metal
- Length: 40:56
- Label: Hellhound
- Producer: Scott Weinrich, Scott Reeder, Mathius Schneeberger, Greg Rogers

The Obsessed chronology
The Obsessed (1990)	Lunar Womb (1991)	The Church Within (1994)

Reissue cover

Professional ratings
Review scores
Source	Rating
AllMusic	4.5/5 stars
Collector's Guide to Heavy Metal	7/10

Lunar Womb is the second studio album by American heavy metal band The Obsessed. It was released in 1991 by Hellhound Records and reissued in 2006 by MeteorCity. The painting on the cover is entitled Saturn Devouring His Son by Francisco de Goya.

== Track listing ==
All songs written by The Obsessed.

1. "Brother Blue Steel" – 3:26
2. "Bardo" – 2:20
3. "Hiding Mask" – 3:53
4. "Spew" – 3:06
5. "Kachina" – 3:43
6. "Jaded" – 3:57
7. "Back to Zero" – 3:57
8. "No Blame" – 1:25
9. "No Mas" – 2:51
10. "Endless Circles" – 4:11
11. "Lunar Womb" – 6:21
12. "Embryo" – 1:46

== Personnel ==
- Scott "Wino" Weinrich – vocals and guitar, producer
- Scott Reeder – bass, vocals on "Bardo" and "Back to Zero", producer, additional engineering
- Greg Rogers – drums, producer

Production

- Mathias Schneeberger – producer, engineer
- Michael Böhl, Tom Reiss – executive producers
