= Daikaijū no Gyakushū =

1986 video game

- Developer: Taito
- Publisher: Taito
- Platform: Arcade
- Release: 1986
- Genre: Shoot 'em up
- Modes: Single-player, multiplayer

Daikaijū no Gyakushū (大怪獣の逆襲; Giant Monster Counter Attack) is a shoot 'em up arcade video game released by Taito in 1986. While not officially a Godzilla game, the concept and even the music are heavily influenced by Tohos Godzilla.
