= Electrical storm (disambiguation) =

Electrical storm may refer to:

- A thunderstorm
- A medical condition of chaotic electrical activity of the heart, usually manifested by ventricular tachycardia
- "Electrical Storm" (song), song by U2
- Electrical Storm (album), the debut solo album by Ed Kuepper
- An Electric Storm, the debut album by White Noise
