= Count Raven =

Swedish doom metal band

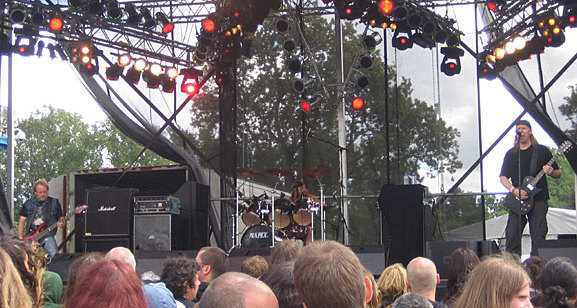
- Count Raven at Wacken Open Air 2005

Background information
- Origin: Stockholm, Sweden
- Genres: Doom metal
- Years active: 1989–1998, 2003–present
- Labels: Hellhound, Nuclear Blast, I Hate
- Members: Dan "Fodde" Fondelius; Jens Bock; Samuel Cornelsen
- Past members: Christer "Renfield" Pettersson; Christian Linderson; Fredrik Jansson; Tommy "Wilbur" Eriksson; Patrick Lundin

Count Raven are a Swedish doom metal band established in 1989. From 1990 to 1996, the band released four studio albums, then broke up in 1998. In 2003, they reunited and in 2009 released their fifth album, Mammons War.

== History ==
The band, formed in 1987 by vocalist Christian Linderson, guitarist Dan Fondelius, bassist Tommy Eriksson, and drummer Christer Pettersson, was called originally Stormvarning. In 1989, they changed their name to Count Raven, and released their debut album, Storm Warning, a year later. It received positive reviews from the European metal press (4 K's in Kerrang!, 10/10 in Rock Hard, 6/7 in Metal Hammer).

Linderson then left to join Saint Vitus and Dan "Fodde" Fondelius became the new frontman, beginning with 1992's Destruction of the Void, released via Nuclear Blast Records, to be declared 'Doom Album of the Year' by Rock Hard magazine. The band's third album High on Infinity appeared one year later, after which the band took a three-year break before returning in 1996 with Messiah of Confusion, which dealt with the band's outlook on society and its dubious ways. "The album's name is our bass player's nickname, but when the album began to see the light of day, we thought the title was a good idea. There's a lot of 'messiahs of confusion' out there", drummer Christer Pettersson explained.

In 1998, Count Raven broke up. Dan Fondelius formed a new doom metal band called Doomsday Government, while Eriksson joined Semlah in 2001. In 2003, the trio reformed, broke up again in 2006 and revived instantly with Fondelius at the helm, Fredrik Jansson (ex-Abramis Brama) on bass, and Jens Bock on drums. In 2009, Count Raven's fifth album Mammons War, produced by Zeb King and released by I Hate, came out. The album earned a positive review by Kerrang! which gave it a 4K rating.

Count Raven signed a new record deal with I Hate on 1 February 2019 and released their sixth studio album, The Sixth Storm in 2021.

== Members ==
=== Current ===
- Dan "Fodde" Fondelius – vocals (1992–1998, 2003–present); guitars, keyboards (1989–1998; 2003–present)
- Jens Bock – drums (2006–2009; 2011–present)
- Samuel Cornelsen – bass (2016–present)

=== Former ===
- Christian Linderson – vocals (1989–1992)
- Christer "Renfield" Pettersson – drums (1989–1998; 2003–2006)
- Fredrik Jansson – bass (2006–2011)
- Tommy "Wilbur" Eriksson – bass (1989–1998; 2003–2006; 2011–2016)
- Patrick Lundin – drums (2009–2011)

== Discography ==
=== Demos ===
- Demo 89 (1989)
- Indignus Famulus (1989)

=== Split albums ===
- Wolfmoon/Wedded to Grief (split album with Griftegård, 2010)

=== Studio albums ===
- Storm Warning (Hellhound/Phantom Import, 1990)
- Destruction of the Void (Nuclear Blast, 1992)
- High on Infinity (Hellhound, 1994)
- Messiah of Confusion (Hellhound, 1996)
- Mammons War (I Hate, 2009)
- The Sixth Storm (I Hate Records, 2021)
