= Planet Gemini (band) =

American doom metal band

- Origin: New Bedford, Massachusetts, United States
- Genres: Heavy Metal
- Years active: 1997–present
- Label: WoeconstrictoR

Planet Gemini is an American doom metal band. They distribute their music over the internet for free.

== History ==
Planet Gemini was formed in 1997 by vocalist and guitarist Hellion and bassist Josh in Boston, Massachusetts. The band's first "official" release, 13, was made available for download on July 13, 2002 along with album artwork, inlay art and CD label art for their fans to print up themselves. The band's second release, Cauldron of Fuzz, was recorded from leftovers from 13 and was originally slated to be an EP. The original plan was for them to go into the studio and record all night to put three new songs onto the EP for their own collection. They wrote five songs the first night and followed it up the next weekend. Without any sleep they improvised another whole album, and continued the tradition of writing the Cauldron of Fuzz albums under heavy sleep deprivation.

== Post-Josh ==
In July 2006, Josh decided to part ways with the Planet Gemini project, causing Hellion to continue the band on his own. Now a one-man project Planet Gemini's album "Legacy" has been canceled (because the album was supposed to celebrate 10 years of H & Josh's music). On October 31, 2006, Hellion released Cauldron of Fuzz IV: The Finale, for download on the band's official webpage. It was a collection of all unfinished demos and he and Josh worked on. This album will never be completed out of respect for the previous band member. On October 31, 2007, Hellion released Cauldron of Fuzz V: Sometimes it Comes Back, available for free download via the band's official webpage.

== Other Planet Gemini collaborators ==
Hellion has worked with Jeff "Oly" Olson of the Chicago-based Doom Metal band Trouble. On a project that was tentatively entitled "The HOLY Project".

Hellion also collaborated with Vinny Appice in 2006, which never got released due to Josh leaving the band.

Hellion is also working on a side project called "Loomis" that he has talked little about on his webpage which consists of four local musicians Dan Jagoda (drums), Greg Furious (bass), Jeff Saude (guitar), Hellion (guitar, vocals). Hellion stated on his webpage that he would have demos available as soon as they are written on his official webpage.

== Musical style ==
Planet Gemini produced a much more groove oriented doom metal. Influences include Black Sabbath, Trouble, Candlemass, and other doom metal bands.

== Discography ==
- 13 - July 2002
- Cauldron of Fuzz - October 31, 2002
- SuperGod[t]Devilman - July 2003
- Cauldron of Fuzz 2 (The Ritual Continues) - October 31, 2003
- Cauldron of Fuzz 2 (The Bonus Material) - October 31, 2003
- Blueprint DIABOLIC (Demo) - June 2004
- Legion: Cauldron of Fuzz 3 - October 31, 2004
- Wizards Blood - December 2005
- Cauldron of Fuzz IV: The Finale, 2006
- Cauldron of Fuzz V: Sometimes it Comes Back - 2007
- Cauldron of Fuzz V: Sometimes it Comes Back [The Unrated Version] - TBD
- Wicked - August 4, 2008
- Cauldron of Fuzz: SiX - October 31, 2009
- See How the Hands Do Murder (Compilation) - 2011
- The Devil Bides His Time (Compilation) - 2011
- The Midnight Channel - February 28, 2016
- House of Devils - June 2023
- You, Me & the Moon - August 2023
- The Electric Secrets of Heaven - October 2023
- The Devil Box - December 2023
