= Forgotten Tomb =

Italian black metal band

- Origin: Piacenza, Italy
- Genres: Black metal, gothic metal, doom metal, depressive black metal (early)
- Years active: 1999–present
- Labels: Adipocere, Avantgarde, Selbstmord Services
- Website: Forgotten Tomb on Facebook

Forgotten Tomb is an Italian extreme metal band from Piacenza. It was founded in 1999 by Ferdinando "Herr Morbid" Marchisio as a one-man black metal project after his previous band, Sacrater, disbanded. Early lyrics revolved around depression and suicide, while recent albums' lyrics deal with negativity and nihilism. The group has released ten albums.

== History ==
Ferdinando "Herr Morbid" Marchisio founded the band in 1999 as a one-man project after the disbanding of his previous band, Sacrater. That year, Marchisio recorded Forgotten Tomb's first EP, Obscura Arcana Mortis (2000) as a solo undertaking. Treblinka Productions released the CD the following year in a limited, 215-copy edition.

Selbstmord Services released the band's first full-length album, Songs to Leave, in 2002. Marchisio self-recorded and self-produced it. Springtime Depression (2003) was the final Forgotten Tomb album where Marchisio played all instruments. Love's Burial Ground followed in 2004, the first Forgotten Tomb album recorded with a complete lineup. Adipocere Records released Springtime Depression and Love's Burial Ground.

In 2006, Forgotten Tomb signed with Avantgarde Music and recorded Negative Megalomania, released in January 2007. In 2006, they appeared on the Katatonia tribute album A Tribute to Katatonia, December Songs, covering "Nowhere". Avantgarde Music released the compilation album Vol. 5: 1999–2009 in August 2010, featuring re-recordings of old songs and two covers of Nirvana and Black Flag.

== Musical style ==
AllMusic describes Forgotten Tomb as a "black metal outfit that flirts with doom and goth". The lyrical themes of the band's early albums revolve mostly around depression and suicide, while the recent albums' lyrics deal with negativity and nihilism.

== Members ==
Current members

- Ferdinando "Herr Morbid" Marchisio – guitars, vocals (1999–present), everything (1999-2003)
- Alessandro "Algol" Comerio – bass guitar (2003–present)
- Gianmarco "Asher" Rossi – drums (2003–present)

Past members

- Torment (Real Name Unknown) – bass guitar (1999)
- Tiziano "Razor SK" Scassa – lead guitars (2003–2011)
- Henrik "Nordvargr" Björkk – effects (2004–2008; session 2004)
- Andrea "A." Ponzoni – lead guitars (2011–2017)

Session musicians

- Ted Wedebrand – drums (2002–2003)

Timeline

== Discography ==
Albums

- Songs to Leave (2002)
- Springtime Depression (2003)
- Love's Burial Ground (2004)
- Negative Megalomania (2007)
- Under Saturn Retrograde (2011)
- ...And Don't Deliver Us from Evil... (2012)
- Hurt Yourself and the Ones You Love (2015)
- We Owe You Nothing (2017)
- Nihilistic Estrangement (2020)
- Nightfloating (2024)

EPs

- Obscura Arcana Mortis (2000)
- Deprived (2012)

Other releases

- Tormenting Legends Part I (2003)
- December Songs – A Tribute to Katatonia (Katatonia cover album, 2006)
- Vol 5: 1999–2009 (live, in-studio compilation album, 2010)
- A Tribute to GG Allin – split by Forgotten Tomb / Whiskey Ritual (2011)
- Darkness in Stereo: Eine Symphonie des Todes – Live in Germany (2014)
