= Hellhound Records =

German record label

Hellhound
- Founded: 1988
- Defunct: 1996
- Status: Defunct
- Distributor(s): Noise Records
- Genre: Heavy metal Doom metal
- Country of origin: Germany

Hellhound Records was a German record label during the late 1980s and 1990s, self-described as "the heaviest label on earth". They became known for putting out doom metal, with artists such as Saint Vitus and The Obsessed. In the early 1990s Hellhound signed a number of Maryland doom bands such as Internal Void, Iron Man, Revelation, Wretched and Unorthodox. They quickly became a prominent label in the doom metal genre. Some of the Hellhound releases were distributed in the US by Noise Records and Noise began pressing some of the later releases after Hellhound's demise. Noise released a compilation entitled Pure Noise which featured a number of Hellhound bands along with many Noise bands as well. Only a few Hellhound releases were re-released by current labels, such as Southern Lord Records and Japan's Leaf Hound Records.

== Discography ==
1. Eddie Dixon - "Relentless" 7" (1989)
2. Jingo de Lunch - Axe to Grind (1989)
3. Scarlet - Red Alert (1989)
4. God BC - God BC (1989)
5. Saint Vitus - V (1989)
6. Toxic Reasons - Anything for Money (1989)
7. Lazy Cowgirls - How It Looks, How It Is (1990)
8. The Obsessed - The Obsessed (1990)
9. Count Raven - Storm Warning (1990)
10. Saint Vitus - Live (1990)
11. Hyste'riah G.B.C. - Snakeworld (1991)
12. Angelus - Kneel Down and Pray (1991)
13. Pigmy Love Circus - Drink Free Forever (1991)
14. What the Hell! compilation (1991)
15. The Obsessed - Lunar Womb (1992)
16. Pigmy Love Circus - When Clowns Become Kings (1992)
17. Saint Vitus - C.O.D. (1992)
18. Internal Void - Standing on the Sun (1993)
19. Count Raven - Destruction of the Void (1993)
20. Revelation - Never Comes Silence (1993)
21. Unorthodox - Asylum (1993)
22. Iron Man - Black Night (1993)
23. Lost Breed - The Evil in You and Me (1993)
24. Wretched - Life Out There (1993)
25. Buzzard - Churp!!! (1993)
26. Count Raven - High on Infinity (1993)
27. Year Zero - Nihil's Flame (1993)
28. Vortex of Insanity - Social Decay (1994)
29. The Obsessed - The Church Within (1994)
30. Unorthodox - Balance of Power (1994)
31. Wretched - Psychosomatic Medicine (1994)
32. Hellhound Compilation (1994)
33. Lost Breed - Save Yourself (1994)
34. Iron Man - The Passage (1994)
35. Saint Vitus - Die Healing (1995)
36. Revelation - ...Yet So Far (1995)
37. Blood Farmers - Blood Farmers (1995)
38. Year Zero - Creation (1995)
39. Hundred Years - Hundred Years (1995)
40. It Is I - Evolve (1995)
41. Wretched - Center of the Universe (1995)
42. Count Raven - Messiah of Confusion (1996)

== Reissued ==
- Saint Vitus - V (Southern Lord Records)
- Saint Vitus - Live (Southern Lord Records)
- Saint Vitus - Die Healing LP (Buried By Time And Dust Records)
- Saint Vitus - Die Healing (Seasons Of Mist)
- Saint Vitus - C.O.D. (Seasons Of Mist)
- The Obsessed - The Obsessed (Tolotta Records)
- The Obsessed - Lunar Womb (MeteorCity Records)
- The Obsessed - The Church Within 2 x 10" (Self-released)
- The Obsessed - The Church Within (Real Gone Music)
- Count Raven - Storm Warning (Cyclone Empire)
- Count Raven - Destruction of the Void (Cyclone Empire)
- Count Raven - High on Infinity (Cyclone Empire)
- Count Raven - Messiah of Confusion (Cyclone Empire)
- Revelation - Never Comes Silence (Leaf Hound Records)
- Revelation - Never Comes Silence (Shadow Kingdom Records)
- Revelation- ...Yet So Far (Shadow Kingdom Records)
- Iron Man - Black Night (Shadow Kingdom Records)
- Iron Man - The Passage (Leaf Hound Records)
- Iron Man - The Passage (Shadow Kingdom Records)
- Unorthodox - Asylum (Bipolar Demand Records)
- Wretched - Center of the Universe (Highland Ridge Records)
- Blood Farmers - s/t (Leaf Hound Records)
- Internal Void - Standing on the Sun 2 LP (Svart Records)
- Lost Breed - The Evil in You and Me (Shadow Kingdom Records)
- Lost Breed - Save Yourself (Shadow Kingdom Records)

== See also ==
- List of record labels
