= Sons of Otis =

Canadian stoner rock band

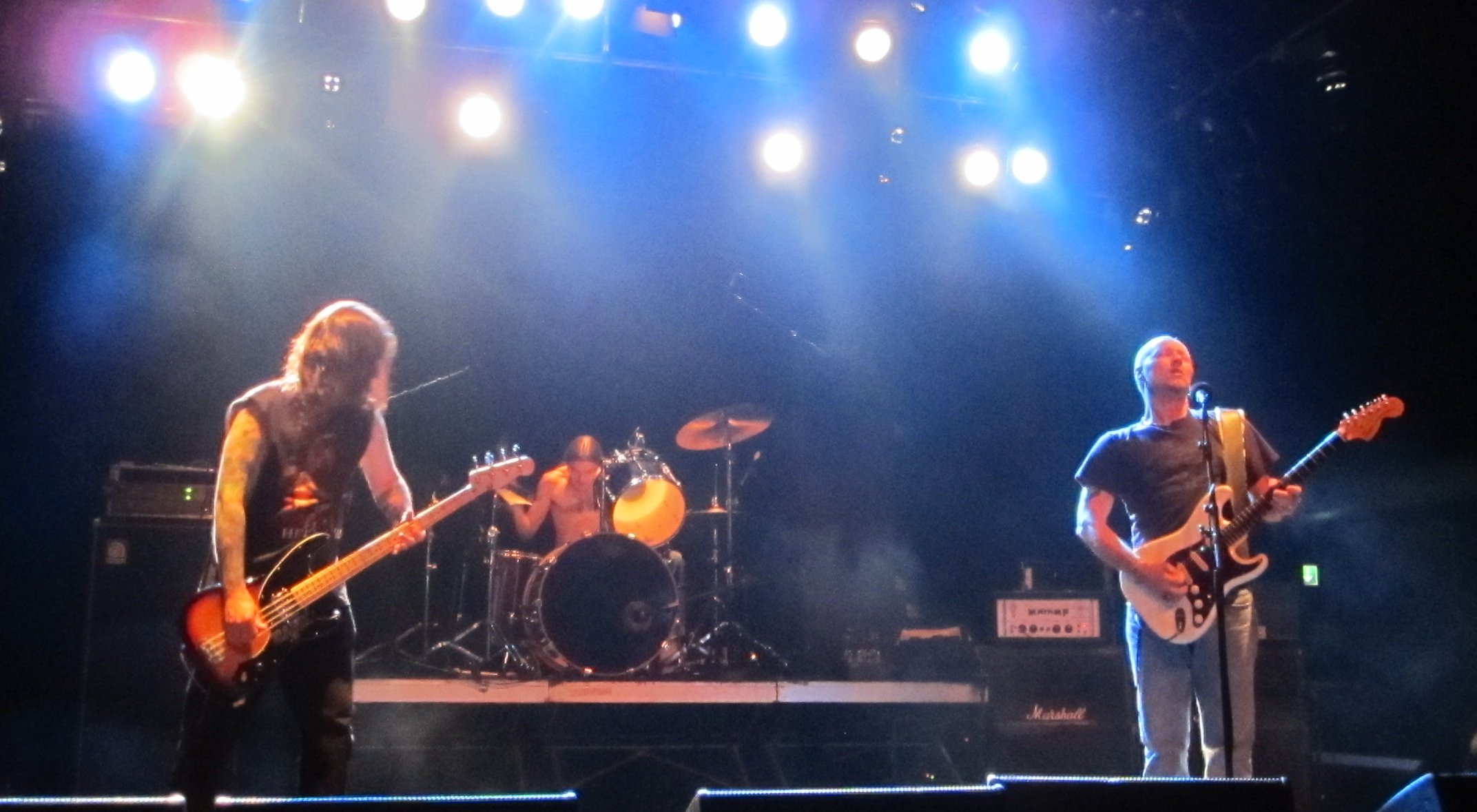
- Sons of Otis - Live concert in 2011

Background information
- Origin: Toronto, Ontario, Canada
- Genres: Stoner rock, space rock, doom metal
- Years active: 1992–present
- Label: Small Stone
- Members: Ken Baluke; Frank Sargeant; Ryan Aubin

Sons of Otis are a Canadian stoner rock band from Toronto, Ontario.

== History ==
The band was formed by Ken Baluke in Toronto sometime around the years 1992 and 1993. At first it was called just Otis, but for legal reasons had to be changed to "Sons of Otis". Strongly influenced by the underground heavy music of the time (Melvins/Fudge Tunnel/Shallow N.D), their first release, Paid to Suffer, came out in 1994.

In 1996, the band released the album Spacejumbofudge on the Hypnotic label. The album was re-released in 2000 by Mans Ruin after Hypnotic closed up. Temple Ball was released in 1999. The band toured in Europe in 2000.

The band changed drummers frequently until May 2001 and at times resorted to a drum machine for recordings as well as performances.

In 2002, the band toured North America with Electric Wizard and Unearthly Trance. In 2018, the band toured Europe with Bongzilla, Dopethrone, and Church of Misery; as well as playing Hellfest, Stoned from the Underground, and Red Smoke festivals.

In 2006, the band released an EP which included a cover of Hoyt Axton's "The Pusher".

Three more albums, X, Exile, and Seismic were released between 2005 and 2012. Isolation was released in 2020.

On September 11, 2024, Sons of Otis served as support for High On Fire in Toronto at the Axis Club as part of the latter's Cometh the Storm tour.

== Members ==
=== Current ===
- Ken Baluke – guitars, vocals
- Jay Lioumanis – drums

=== Past ===
- John Moran – drums (1992–1995)
- Emilio Mammone – drums (1996–1998, 1999–2001) - including 2000 European tour with Electric Wizard.
- Ryan Aubin (2001–2022)
- Jenn McCubbin (2021–2023)

==== Session musicians ====
- Tony Jacome – drums on the Songs for Worship (2001)

== Discography ==
- 1994 - Paid to Suffer
- 1996 - Spacejumbofudge
- 1999 - Temple Ball
- 2001 - Untitled EP (also known as The Pusher EP)
- 2001 - Songs for Worship
- 2005 - X
- 2007 - Sons of Otis / Queen Elephantine - Split
- 2009 - Exiled
- 2012 - Seismic
- 2018 - Live in Den Bosch
- 2020 - Isolation
