= Thunderstorm (band) =

Italian doom metal band

- Origin: Bergamo, Italy
- Genre: Doom metal
- Years active: 1992–2011
- Labels: Northwind Records (2000–2003); Dragonheart Records (2003–present)
- Members: Fabio "Thunder" Bellan (vocals, guitars) Omar Roncalli (bass) Attilio Coldani (drums)
- Past members: Massimo Tironi (drums); Sandro Mazzoleni (guitars)
- Website: www.thunderstorm-doom.com

Thunderstorm was a doom metal band from Bergamo, Italy. Formed in the early 1990s as a classic heavy metal band, with touches of a down tuned sound.

== History ==
During their first incarnation in the early 1990s, they released two demos, Thunderstorm (1992) and Force of Evil (1994). In 1998, the band split up due to musical incompatibility issues between members. Their leader and vocalist Fabio "Thunder" Bellan met drummer Massimo Tironi and formed a new Thunderstorm band, this time geared the sound toward classic doom metal in style of Black Sabbath, Candlemass, and Trouble, and called themselves Sad Symphony. Joining the band soon after was bassist Omar Roncalli, after which the named was then switched back to the original moniker Thunderstorm, and a second guitarist, Sandro Mazzoleni, joined the band. In 1999, this line-up produced a demo called Sad Symphony, which generated interest among record labels, and the band was signed to Northwind Records.

Under Northwind, the band released two full-length albums, Sad Symphony (2000) and Witch Hunter Tales (2002). During this time period, Mazzoleni and Tironi departed, Bellan took over full-time guitar duties and brought in new drummer Attilio Coldani. After the latter album was completed, the band decided to switch labels and signed a multi-album deal with Italian label Dragonheart Records and released a full-length album in 2004, Faithless Soul.

They disbanded in November 2011 citing musical differences, which was displayed on their official website until the site was taken down.

Their albums were recorded at New Sin Studio in Loria, Italy.

== Discography ==
=== Demos ===
- Force of Evil (1994)
- Sad Symphony (1999)
- Witch Hunter (2001)

=== Albums ===
- Sad Symphony (Northwind, 2000)
- Witchunter Tales (Northwind, 2002)
- Faithless Soul (Dragonheart, 2004)
- As We Die Alone (Dragonheart, 2007)
- Nero Enigma (Audioglobe S.R.L., 2010)
