= Wretched (doom metal band) =

American doom metal band

- Origin: Maryland, United States
- Genres: Doom metal, stoner metal
- Years active: 1993–2009
- Labels: Hellhound
- Past members: Dave Sherman; Jon Blank; Jeff Parsons; John Koutsioukis; Cougin; Louis Strachan; Gus Basilika; Mike Phillips; Gary Isom

Wretched was an American doom metal band from Maryland, formed in the 1990s.

== Biography ==
Wretched was one of many Maryland doom bands to be picked up by Hellhound Records in the early 1990s. The band put out three albums on Hellhound before disbanding. Singer Dave Sherman would go on to play bass in Spirit Caravan and sing in Earthride. Following the recording of Center of the Universe Gary Isom joined the band on drums. Isom would later reunite with Sherman in Spirit Caravan.

The band has been on-again, off-again over the last decade. They officially disbanded in 2005 but as of 2006 had announced they were back together with a new line-up.

In 2007, Wretched re-released Center of the Universe on their own Highland Ridge Records.

In May 2009, Wretched broke up again after Jon Blank's death. Their EP Black Ambience was released in September.

== Members ==
- Dave Sherman – vocals
- Jon Blank – vocals
- Jeff Parsons – guitar
- John Koutsioukis – bass
- Cougin – drums
- Gus Baslika – drums on Life Out There and Psychosomatic Medicine
- Mike Phillips – drums on Center of the Universe
- Gary Isom – drums

== Discography ==
- Life Out There (Hellhound Records 1993)
- Psychosomatic Medicine (Hellhound Records 1994)
- Center of the Universe (Hellhound Records 1995)
- Black Ambience (Psychedoomelic Records 2009)

=== Reissue ===
- Center of the Universe (Highland Ridge Records 2007)
