= Unorthodox (band) =

American doom metal band

- Origin: Maryland, United States
- Genres: Doom metal, stoner metal, progressive metal
- Years active: 1992 - 2024
- Labels: Hellhound, The Church Within
- Past members: Dale Flood; Earl Screyer; Jeff Parsons; Josh Hart; Ronnie Kalimon; John Koutsioukis; Mikey Phillips; Mark Ammen; Gary Isom; Jon Blank; Alyson Blake Dellinger; Alan Pfeifer

Unorthodox was an American doom metal band from Maryland.

== History ==
Unorthodox were originally called Asylum. They changed their name to Unorthodox after a band with a similar name achieved national success. They were one of many Maryland bands to be picked up in the early 1990s by Germany's Hellhound Records. They released two albums under Hellhound, 1993's Asylum and 1995's Balance of Power.

In 1994, Doom Records released a compilation entitled A Double Dose of Doom, featuring Obstination (who would later become Asylum) and Rat Salad (who would go on to become Iron Man). They also had a song, "Lifeline" on the Doom Capital compilation (2004 Crucial Blast Records). In 2007, Bipolar Demand Records re-released Asylum and included three bonus tracks. In 2008, the lineup of Dale Flood, Mark Ammen, and Gary Isom recorded a third album, Awaken, which was released on The Church Within Records in October 2008.

In 2009, Dale Flood moved to Nashville, Tennessee to raise his daughter. Unorthodox still played sporadic festival appearances over the next several years with the original "Asylum" lineup until 2016. In 2017, he formed a new version of Unorthodox based in Nashville featuring Flummox bassist and drummer, Alyson Blake Dellinger and Alan Pfeifer.

Guitarist, vocalist and bandleader Dale Flood died in August 2024, aged 60.

== Discography ==
=== Albums ===
- Asylum (Hellhound Records 1993)
- Balance of Power (Hellhound Records 1995)
- Awaken (The Church Within Records 2008)

=== Reissue ===
- Asylum +3 (Bipolar Demand Records 2007)
