= Mindrot =

American extreme metal band

Background information
- Origin: Westminster, California, U.S.
- Genre: Death-doom
- Years active: 1989–1998
- Labels: Tempest, Relapse, Nuclear Blast
- Past members: Matt Fisher; Daniel Kaufman; Adrian Leroux; John Flood; Evan Kilbourne; Matt (Mauz) Parillo; Alfred Higdeon

Mindrot was an American death-doom metal band formed in 1989 by Adrian Leroux and Matt Fisher in Westminster, California. They released two studio albums before disbanding in 1998.

== History ==
The band began in 1989 in Westminster, California. After a year of rehearsal and lineup adjustments, the band held a demo release in a living room in Huntington Beach with Glycine Max in June 1990. Shows would follow with other notable bands; Born Against, Rorschach, Neurosis, Bolt Thrower, Grave, Nausea, and Voodoo Glow Skulls.

The band next recorded the Endeavor EP and released it through a double-label, Tempest Records and Angry Thoreauan, following with a split 7-inch with a band called Apocalypse (not to be confused with the more notable band also called Apocalypse).

In 1992, the first major lineup change came with the addition of long time friend Evan Kilbourne on drums, with whom they recorded Live in the Studio (produced by Jim Barnes, who also produced Dawning and Soul) .

In late 1992, Faded Dream was recorded, and was used to shop the band to record labels. One record label wanted to release "Faded Dream", but the band wanted to re-record some parts for better sound quality. That record label did not want to spend any money on the recording and thus it was never properly released.

In 1994, another lineup change occurred. Matt Parrillo decided it would be in his best interests to leave the band and pursue his other band Dystopia as well as his graphic arts career. He was replaced by John Flood, another good friend with the band (as well as one of Matt Fisher's former bandmates in Rupture, which went on to become Confrontation).

Forlorn was released in 1995, followed by Dawning.

Relapse Records and Nuclear Blast Records ended their business relationship with each other, ending European distribution for Dawning.

After the release of Soul, in early 1998 Mindrot played its last show, unknown to anyone there or even anyone in the band. It took place at Club Mesa in Costa Mesa, California with Oxbow. No more than 30 people were in attendance included in the audience guitarist and SST mastermind Greg Ginn.

The band ostensibly broke up when Evan Kilbourne decided to pursue other musical interests in Save Ferris.

== Members ==
=== Final members ===
- Matt Fisher – bass, keyboards, vocals (1989–1998; died 2020)
- Dan Kaufman – guitar, vocals (1989–1998)
- Adrian Leroux – vocals (1989–1998)
- Evan Kilbourne – drums (1992–1998)
- John Flood – guitar, keyboards, piano (1994–1998)

=== Past members ===
- Al Higdon – drums (1989–1992)
- Matt Parrillo – guitar (1989–1994)

== Discography ==
=== Demos ===
- Untitled (1990)
- Live in the Studio (1992)
- Faded Dream (1992)

=== Singles ===
- "Endeavor" (1991)
- Mindrot/Apocalypse (split 7-inch, 1992)

=== Albums and EPs ===
- Forlorn EP (1995)
- Dawning (1995)
- Soul (1998)

== Related bands ==
- Eyes of Fire (Century Media), featuring: Dan Kaufman (guitar and vocals) and Matt Fisher (bass and vocals)
- Save Ferris (Epic Records), featuring: Evan Kilbourne (drums)
- Dystopia (Life is Abuse), featuring: Matt (Mauz) Parrillo (guitar and vocals), Dan Kaufman (vocals)
- Morgion (Relapse Records), featuring: Adrian Leroux (vocals during the "Doomination of Europe" tour in 2003)
