= Spiritus Mortis =

Finnish heavy metal band

- Origin: Alavus, Finland
- Genres: Heavy metal, doom metal
- Years active: 1987–present
- Labels: Svart; Firebox; Rage Of Achilles; Black Lotus
- Members: Kimmo Perämäki; Jussi Maijala; Kari Lavila; Teemu Maijala; Jarkko Seppälä
- Past members: Sami Hynninen; Vesa Lampi; Tomi Murtomäki; VP Rapo; Veli-Matti Yli-Mäyry

Spiritus Mortis is a heavy metal band from Finland. They are believed to be the first band in Finland to play doom metal.

== History ==
The band was formed in 1987 as Rigor Mortis, with the founding members Teemu Maijala (bass, vocals), Jussi Maijala (guitars) and VP Rapo (drums). Due to the existence of an American metal band also called Rigor Mortis, they changed their name to Spiritus Mortis. Spiritus Mortis recorded four demos as a trio, one demo in 1997 with Tomi Murtomäki and with Vesa they recorded "Demo 2000".

In 2001 Veli-Matti Yli-Mäyry joined and the band recorded two demos, Forward to the Battle (2001) and Hot Summer of Love (2002) and their first self-titled album, released through Rage of Achilles in 2004. During recording of the self-titled album, Veli-Matti announced that he was going to leave the band, and so Jarkko Seppälä was recruited as the new drummer.

After Rage of Achilles folded, Spiritus Mortis began looking for new record deal. They signed with Black Lotus Records and released their second album, "Fallen", through them in 2006. After Black Lotus Records also folded, Vesa Lampi stated he had lost his interest in music and left the band. Tomi Murtomäki took his place for the "20 years of Spiritus Mortis" tour, but he did not wish to continue full-time. In January 2009 it was announced that Sami Hynninen would take the place as vocalist.

Spiritus Mortis signed a record deal with Firebox Records and their third album "The God Behind the God" was released May 2009. Their fourth album "The Year is One" followed in 2016 on Svart Records.

== Band members ==
- Jussi Maijala - guitar (1987-present)
- Teemu Maijala - bass (1987-present) vocals (1987-1996)
- Markus Kuula - drums (2021-present)
- Kimmo Perämäki - vocals (2004, 2018-present)
- Kari Lavila - guitar (2006-present)

=== Former members ===
- VP Rapo - drums (1987-2000) guitar (2000-2006)
- Tomi Murtomäki - vocals (1997-1999, 2007)
- Vesa Lampi - vocals (1999-2007)
- Veli-Matti Yli-Mäyry - drums (2001-2003)
- Sami Albert Hynninen - vocals (2009-2017)
- Jarkko Seppälä - drums (2003-2021)

== Discography ==
=== Albums ===
- Spiritus Mortis (Rage of Achilles, January 2004)
- Fallen (Black Lotus Records, March 2006)
- From the Ultima Thule-split / Spiritus Mortis / The Gates Of Slumber (Emissary Records, October 2007)
- Burned Alive - split cassette/Spiritus Mortis/Witchtiger (Metal Warning, June 2008)
- When The Wind Howled With A Human Voice/ Waiting for the Sun 7" (Firebox, March 2009)
- The God Behind the God (Firebox, May 2009)
- Spiritus Mortis/Fall of the Idols -split 12" LP (I Hate Records, October 2009)
- The Year Is One (Svart Records, November 2016)
- The Great Seal (2022, Svart Records)

=== Demos ===
- At the Halls of Death (August 1990)
- Demo (January 1994)
- Demo (November 1996)
- Demo (June 1997)
- Ars Moriendi (December 1997)
- Demo 2000 (April 2000)
- Forward to Battle (February 2001)
- Hot Summer of Love (October 2002)

=== Compilations ===
- Rock-Yhdistys CD "Rise From Hell, Baron Samedi" (Alavuden Rock-yhdistys, 1992)
- Out of Focus, vol. II "The Omen"
- Nad Brzegami Czasu "Sleeping Beneath The Lawn"
- At the Mountains of Madness II "Flames"
- Metal On Metal II "Leave Me, Rise From Hell" (Metal Warning, August 2006)
- Knock'em Down to the Size "Sweet Oblivion" (Metal Coven Records, January 2008)
