= Earthride =

American doom metal band

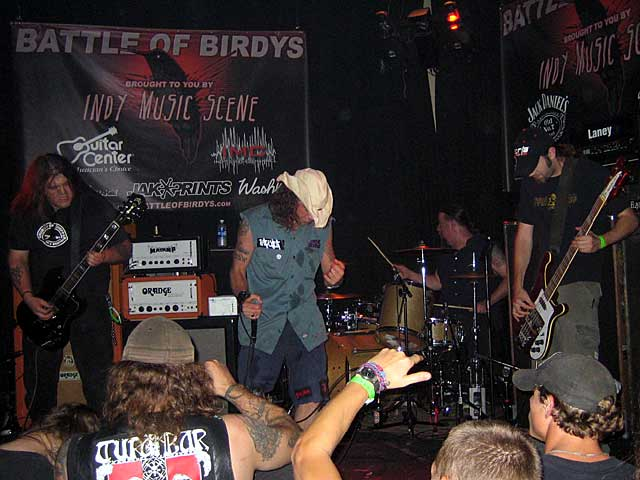
- Earthride in 2005

Background information
- Origin: Maryland, United States
- Genres: Doom metal, stoner metal, biker metal
- Years active: 2000–present
- Labels: Southern Lord, Earth Brain
- Members: Kyle Van Steinburg; Josh Hart; Eric Little
- Past members: Dave Sherman; Joe Ruthvin; Rob Hampshire; Mick Schauer

Earthride is an American doom metal band from Maryland.

== Biography ==
Earthride formed in 2000 after the demise of Dave Sherman's previous band, Spirit Caravan. They released their self-titled EP the same year on their own Earth Brain label. They recorded their next release, 2005 Vampire Circus, with Corrosion of Conformity's Mike Dean acting as producer. It was released on Southern Lord Records. Five years later they followed with their third album, Something Wicked, which was also released by Southern Lord.

In 2007, Land o Smiles Records re-released Earthride's self-titled debut EP on 10" vinyl. In the same year, Dave Sherman, Eric Little, Greg Lynn Ball and Edmund Allan Brown recorded a new single on Salt of the Earth Records.

In November 2017, Earthride toured with Buzzov-en. At a stop in Dayton, Ohio, they were joined by Funeral Moon.

== Members ==
- Dave Sherman - vocals (died 2022)
- Greg Lyle Ball – guitars
- Edmond Allan Brown– bass
- Eric Little – drums

== Discography ==
=== Albums ===
- Taming of the Demons CD (Southern Lord Records 2002)
- Vampire Circus CD/Pic Disc (Southern Lord Records/Doomentia Records 2005)
- Something Wicked CD (Earth Brain Records 2010)

=== EPs ===
- Earthride CD (Earth Brain Records 2000)
- Earthride 10" (Land o' Smiles Records 2007)
