= Daikaiju (band) =

American surf punk band, formed 1999

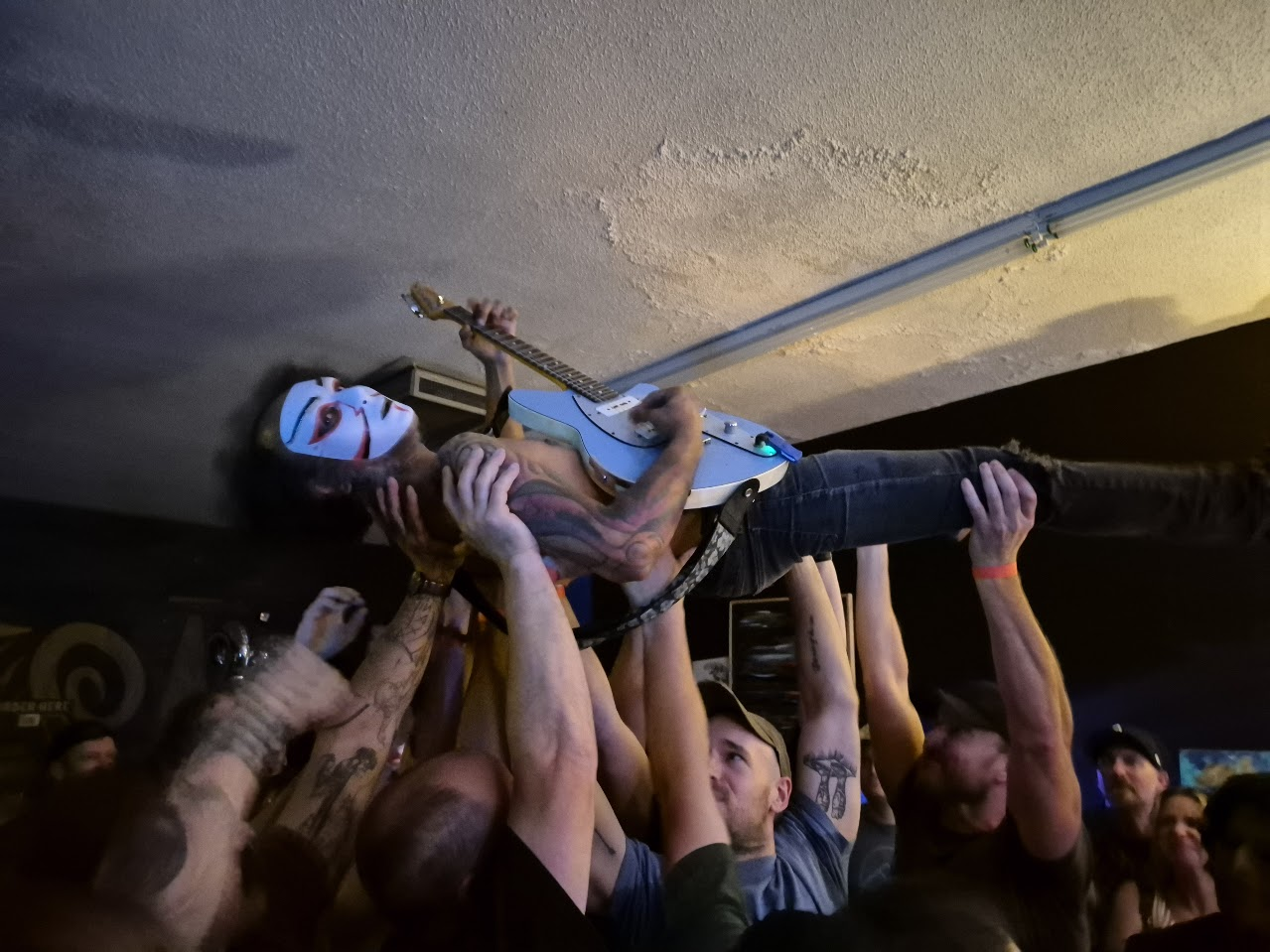
- Secret-Man crowdsurfing at The Philmore South in Grand Rapids, MI

Background information
- Origin: Huntsville, Alabama, United States
- Genre: Surf punk
- Years active: 1999–present
- Labels: Migoto Radiation; Valiant Death Records; Reptile Records; DingDong Records (current)
- Members: Secret-Man (Guitar); Blast-Man (Drums); Ultra-Girl (Guitar/Drums); Crystal-Man (Guitar); Astro-Girl (Bass)
- Past members: Jet-Man (Bass); Merc-Man (Drums); Bat-Man (Bass); Ace-Man (Guitar); Hit-Man (Drums); Smash-Man (Drums); Crash-Man (Drums); Rock-Man (Guitar); Dead-Man (Guitar); Beat-Man (Drums); Shank-Man (Bass); Abstract-Man (Drums); Necro-Man (Guitar); Multi-Man (Keyboard/Guitar); Rumble-Man (Bass); Electro-Man (Keyboards); Hands-Man (Drums); Apollo Buck (Drums); Brain Conflict (Brian Murphree)(Bass); Dymaxion Lee (Marc Elliott)(Guitar); E (Drums); Mr. Nein (Milburn Lominick)(Drums); Tentacles-X (Keyboard/Guitar/Bass); Captain Kanchou (Bass/Guitar); Secret Asian Man (Santanu Mitra)(Guitar)
- Website: daikaiju.org

Daikaiju is an American surf punk band formed in Huntsville, Alabama, in 1999. It is characterized by the kabuki masks worn by its members and their anonymity. The band tours with varying lineups usually consisting of two guitarists, a bassist, and a drummer.

== History ==
Daikaiju originally formed in the winter of 1999.

In 2005, the band released their first full-length album, Daikaiju. Of the album's ten tracks, five were previously recorded (in an earlier form) on 2001's Monster Surf, and two more were previously heard on 2002's The Phasing Spider Menace. The album received mostly positive reviews from critics, with Pitchfork giving the album a 7.8/10, praising the band's "prog muscle" and calling it an "impressive full-length debut".

In 2010, the band released their second full-length album, titled Phase 2.

In a 2012 interview with Florida Geek Scene, the band was asked about the change in personnel between Daikaiju and Phase 2. Daikaiju, in response, referred to the departing members as "casualties".

In 2013, the band toured the Far East visiting China, South Korea, and Japan. Its visit to Japan, in particular, was highly anticipated by fans and the band itself. Daikaiju tied Public Image Ltd. as the 'Best show by a foreign touring act' in Time Out Beijing's "Year's end roundup: the best of Beijing music" for 2013.

== Performing style ==
Daikaiju performs while wearing kabuki masks, and using pseudonyms. They do not speak during performances, instead communicating using hand signals. The band often sets fire to their instruments during live shows.

== Interaction with media ==
Due to how secretive the band is, they rarely grant interviews, and do not mention their real names or private lives (apart from their opinions on monster movies such as Tristar's Godzilla, which they agreed to call Godzilla "in name only") in the interviews they do agree to.

It is a reflection of how wild Daikaiju's live performances are that, on their own website as well as in interviews, they refer to these performances as "attacks"; or instead, in a 2013 interview with Time Out Beijing, referring to them as "Most exciting shower of golden radiance!!!" This likely refers to the band's tendency to use lighter fluid to spray their instruments while the instruments are on fire.

=== Similarity to Man or Astro-man ===
The similarity of the band's sound to Man or Astro-man? has fueled some unconfirmed speculation that the band may contain members of that band. The band's only response to this speculation, a denial (though characteristically vague), appeared in an August 2012 interview:

"Daikaiju have many member of man: secret-man, rock-man, hit-man, and mobile-man!!! Daikaiju also like taste of astro-man but have preference of lizard-man... or aqua-man!!!"

== Discography ==
The band has released two EPs, three studio albums, and two singles.

Name	Release Type	Label	Release date
Monster Surf	EP, Six tracks	Migoto Radiation	February 2001
Little Darlin'	Track from compilation album American Graffiti Revisited	OmOm Music	2001
The Phasing Spider Menace	EP, Three tracks, Three videos	Valiant Death Records	February 2002
Overture	Track from compilation album Jesus Christ Surferstar	OmOm Music	April 2003
Daikaiju	Studio Album, Ten tracks	Reptile Records	March 8, 2005
Phase 2	Studio Album, Ten tracks	DingDong Records	September 21, 2010
Double Fist Attack	Single	DingDong Records	February 19, 2013
Spiral Serpent Strike	Track from compilation album Monsters Of Surf	DingDong Records	January 21, 2014
Cock Lobster	Single	DingDong Records	February 4, 2017
Deluxe Electric Ninja Mistress	Split with Harriers Of Discord	DingDong Records	May 14, 2019
Red Tsunami	Single	DingDong Records	March 10, 2022
Phase 3	Studio Album	DingDong Records	February 21, 2023

== See also ==
- Instrumental surf
- Man Or Astroman?
- The Mermen
