= Dolorian =

Finnish doom metal band

- Origin: Oulu, Finland
- Genres: Doom metal, avant-garde metal
- Years active: 1997–present (on hold since 2006)
- Label: Wounded Love Records
- Website: Official website

Dolorian is a doom metal band from Oulu, Finland, founded in mid-1997 by A. Haapapuro and A. Kukkohovi. Their combination of songs, structures and melodies, vocal styles, and spiritual lyrics set the band apart in their genre.

Dolorian recorded their first demos at Tico-Tico Studios with temporary keyboard player H. Riihinen. They signed with Wounded Love Records. In April 1998, the band, along with new keyboard player J. Ontero, recorded When All the Laughter Has Gone. The album was released in 1999. The following year, the band recorded their second album, Dolorian. Chronicles of Chaos rated the album nine out of ten, calling it a "remarkable achievement by Dolorian."

In 2002, Dolorian recorded songs for a split with Shining, but record label problems delayed its release until 2004. In 2006, the band released Voidwards. The band has been on hold since. All members are involved in dark ambient projects, shifting their concentration away from Dolorian.

== Members ==
- Anti Ittna Haapapuro – vocals, electric guitar (1997–present)
- Ari Kukkohovi – bass guitar, drums, electric guitar (1997–present)
- Jussi Ontero – keyboard (1998–present)

== Discography ==
- 1999 – When All the Laughter Has Gone
- 2001 – Dolorian
- 2006 – Voidwards
