= Iron Man (band) =

American heavy metal band

- Origin: Maryland, United States
- Genres: Heavy metal, doom metal
- Years active: 1988–2018
- Labels: Hellhound, Brainticket, Leaf Hound, Shadow Kingdom, Rise Above, Metal Blade
- Members: Louis Strachan "Screaming Mad" Dee Calhoun; Jason "Mot" Waldmann
- Past members: Alfred Morris III; VIIX; Jared Rein; Jadd Schickler; Jon Owen; Gus Basilika; Joe Donnelly; Dex Dexter; Mike Rix; Rob Levey; Dan Michalak; Nando Tornado Corado; Larry Brown; Ginger; Kim Martin; Ron Kalimon; Gary Isom; Vic Tomaso

Iron Man was an American heavy metal band from Maryland.

== Biography ==
Iron Man began as a Black Sabbath tribute band in 1986 when Alfred Morris III (guitar) and Kim Geoffrey Martin (drums) of Force decided to take all the Black Sabbath songs that they had mixed in to the Force set list since 1976 and start a band dedicated to Alfred's favorite group. Regular rehearsals were held in Kim Martin's mother's home in Bethesda MD with the set lists refined. Alfred suggested that the name Iron Man was to be used whenever the exclusive list of Black Sabbath covers were performed. Kim Martin quit the tribute band a year later to pursue full time variety work. Approximately two years later, Iron Man became an all-original act with Alfred Morris III driving the band vision and sound. Alfred Morris III continued to write songs, utilizing and combining the large catalog of riffs he had built and saved over the years. In 1999 the band released their third studio album, Generation Void. Each album has had a new line-up with Morris being the only constant throughout the years. In 2006, a bootleg recording of Iron Man surfaced entitled Iron Man: Live in Cincinnati. This concert was one of the very few performed on the ill-fated 2000 U.S. Tour. The show was recorded on February 9, 2000 at Annie's Saloon in Cincinnati, Ohio. It was the last show ever with Dan Michalak and Vic Tomaso.

At the beginning of 2000 Iron Man embarked on a 20 city U.S. tour which ended prematurely with two band members (Michalak and Tomaso) leaving. Temporary bassist ViiX recruited two additional temps (Jared Rein on drums and Jadd of MeteorCity Records founder on vocals) for the tour. She also provided a van for the band to use and did various photography and artwork. They resumed touring up until April 2000. This line up played their last show on April 1, 2000 at the Emerson Theatre in Indianapolis, Indiana.

In 2004 Michael Lindenauer took on the role as their manager and helped Morris to revive Iron Man. Morris had recruited new band members, one of which, Jon Owen, was from London, England. This caused problems when they tried to make their first comeback show on July 9, 2005 at the Templars of Doom Festival held in Indianapolis. Jon Owen was unable to secure a proper visa in time and was going through a series of personal problems as well. It took the combined efforts of both Morris and Lindenauer to put the band back together yet again. Ex-members of Maryland doom bands Wretched and Life Beyond (Louis Strachan on bass and Gus Basilika on drums) were recruited for the rhythm section. After a long search Lindenauer secure Joe Donnelly of Sabbra Cadabra (a Black Sabbath tribute band). Iron Man was booked for the Doom Or Be Doomed Festival to be held over three days in Baltimore, Maryland on the weekend of April 13-15th, 2007. Just a month before the show, Basilika left the band over musical differences and drummer Brian "Dex" Dexter filled Basilika's spot. With the new line up intact the band finally made their comeback show as planned on April 15 at the D.O.B.D. Festival. Soon after, the band released the self-produced CDEP Submission.

In 2007, Leaf Hound Records began re-releasing the first two albums originally released on Hellhound Records. Both albums have been remastered. The Passage was re-released on CD. In 2008, Black Night was released on LP with plans to re-release the CD version in the future. And in 2009, Al Morris III guided yet another new lineup of Iron Man into the studio to record the band's fourth album, I Have Returned, released by Shadow Kingdom Records.

2010 saw the departure of drummer Dex Dexter and vocalist Joseph Donnelly, who were replaced by drummer Mike Rix and vocalist "Screaming Mad" Dee Calhoun (ex-After Therapy and Land of Doom). This new lineup quickly recorded and released the self-produced Dominance EP in early 2011.

There are two releases on Doom Records that feature Morris. There is a self-titled Force album and A Double Dose of Doom, which features Rat Salad and Obstination (who would go on to become Unorthodox). In 1979, during the early Force years, Larry Brown was offered a spot in the Bad Brains but declined thinking Force was the better prospect. Morris also appears on the Scene Killer album (2001) on MeteorCity Records, which is a collaboration of musicians from New Jersey bands along with a few out-of-state guests. Former vocalist Rob Levey is now better known for his work in organizing the Stoner Hands of Doom festivals.

On January 15, 2012, Iron Man posted the following announcement on their Facebook page: "Iron Man are happy to announce Jason 'Mot' Waldmann as the band's new permanent drummer. Mot, a longtime friend and fan of Iron Man, recently performed with the band in a fill-in basis, and based on his performance and his friendship and chemistry with the band, has been awarded the full-time position. Iron Man graciously thanks everyone who auditioned; the response was huge, and the choice was far from easy. The evidence of the richness of the talent pool regarding drummers within the MD/VA/DC region was evident during these auditions. Everyone, please welcome Mot to the Iron Man family as we look forward to a very successful 2012!" That summer, Iron Man released their att hålla dig över EP.

On February 4, 2013, Iron Man announced that they were about to begin recording their fifth full-length album, and that they would again be working with Frank Marchand, who engineered I Have Returned. The resulting album, South of the Earth, was released in the UK/Europe on September 30, 2013 via Rise Above Records, and in North America on October 1, 2013 via Metal Blade Records.

On January 10, 2018, Morris died at the age of 60.

== Discography ==
- Black Night CD (1993, Hellhound Records)
- The Passage CD (1994, Hellhound Records)
- Generation Void CD (1999, Brainticket Records)
- Submission EP (2007, self-released)
- I Have Returned CD (2009, Shadow Kingdom Records)
- Dominance EP (2011, self-released)
- att hålla dig över EP (2012, self-released)
- South of the Earth (2013, Rise Above Records/Metal Blade Records)

=== Reissue ===
- The Passage CD (2007 Leaf Hound Records)
- The Passage CD (2010 Shadow Kingdom Records)
- Black Night CD (2011 Shadow Kingdom Records)
- Black Night LP (2012 Shadow Kingdom Records)
- Generation Void CD (2012 Shadow Kingdom Records)
