= The Obsessed =

American doom metal band

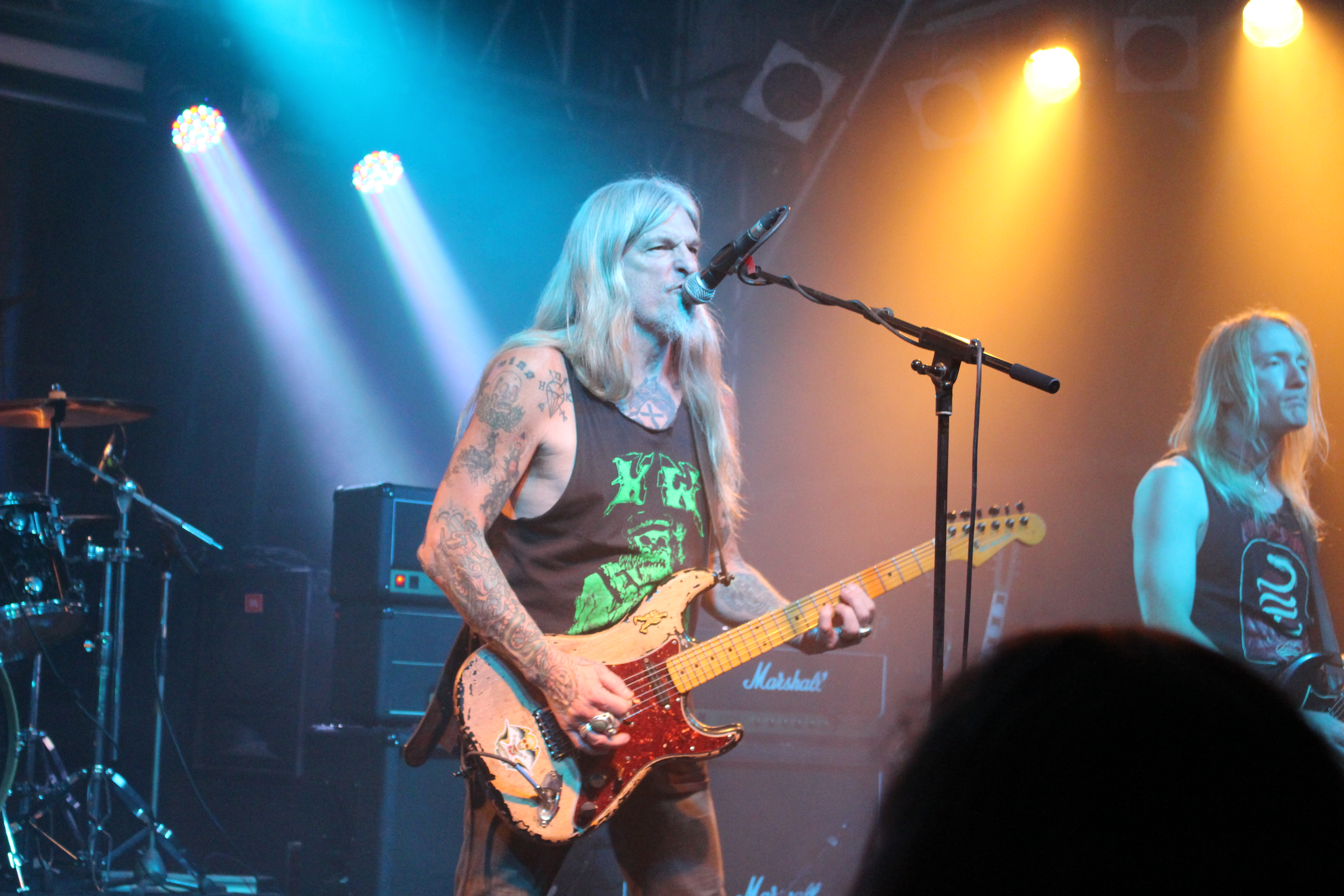
- The Obsessed performing in Germany in 2023

Background information
- Also known as: Warhorse (1976–1979)
- Origin: Potomac, Maryland, U.S.
- Genres: Doom metal; heavy metal; stoner metal
- Years active: 1979–1986; 1989–1995; 2011–2013; 2016–present
- Labels: Hellhound; Columbia; Southern Lord; MeteorCity; Tolotta; Relapse; Ripple Music
- Members: Scott "Wino" Weinrich; Chris Angleberger; Jason Taylor; Bob Pantella
- Past members: Mark Laue; Dave Williams; Ed Gulli; Scott Reeder; Greg Rogers; Guy Pinhas; Dave Sherman; John Reese; Bruce Falkinburg; Reid Raley; Brian White; Brian Costantino

The Obsessed is an American doom metal band from Potomac, Maryland, led by Scott "Wino" Weinrich. Formed in 1979, they recorded a few demos and played a handful of live shows until they first split up in 1986 when Weinrich joined as lead vocalist for Saint Vitus. About two years before his departure from Saint Vitus, Weinrich reformed The Obsessed in 1989, and three studio albums − The Obsessed (1990), Lunar Womb (1991) and The Church Within (1994) − were released before disbanding for the second time in 1995. After reuniting for occasional live shows between 2011 and 2013, the band announced a permanent reunion in March 2016, and has since released two more studio albums: Sacred (2017) and Gilded Sorrow (2024).

== History ==
=== Early career (1976–1985) ===
The band formed originally under the name "Warhorse" in 1976 in Potomac, Maryland, led by Wino. In the late 1970s, Wino's band became known as the Leather Nunz. The band played original punk tunes with singer Billy Beam, Jeff Urban on drums, Robert Krug on rhythm guitar and Mark Laue on bass.

Later on, a new more focused and improved group moved into a band house in Rockville, Maryland and renamed the Obsessed, where some of their most creative and hardest music was written. Before this move, however, original guitar player John Reese and Davey WIlliams on drums departed from the band. The band became a trio and remained that way until 1982 when Vance Bockis and later Norman Lawson joined the band. During this time they released the Sodden Jackal EP (spring 1983) and had one track ("Concrete Cancer") featured on Metal Blade's Metal Massacre VI. The Obsessed also managed to record their debut album in 1985 for Metal Blade, but it never officially surfaced.

=== Splits, first reunion and aftermath (1986–2010) ===
The band broke up in the late 1980s and Wino went west to California to join up with Saint Vitus. Wino recorded three albums, an EP, and a live album with Saint Vitus. Around 1989, the Obsessed reformed and signed to Hellhound Records (Vitus's then current label), which released The Obsessed (originally recorded in 1985) in the following year. This prompted Wino to leave Vitus and focus on the Obsessed full-time, with a new rhythm section consisting of Scott Reeder and Greg Rogers. The band was quickly signed to Hellhound Records and soon released Lunar Womb. Scott Reeder later left to join Kyuss, whereupon he was replaced by Guy Pinhas. After the addition of Pinhas, the Obsessed signed with Columbia Records, through which they released their third album The Church Within to strong critical reviews. To promote The Church Within, the band toured as an opening act for Entombed and Unsane during the first part of 1994. Despite the tour, as well as a large amount of promotion on behalf of Columbia Records (including a 25-minute documentary on the history of the Obsessed), the album did not sell as well as expected. After the demise of the Obsessed, Wino went on to form Shine which changed name to Spirit Caravan and more projects before reuniting with Saint Vitus in 2003 (and again in 2008), while the Obsessed's rhythm section became the basis for Goatsnake.

=== Reunions (2011–present) ===
In September 2011, the Roadburn Festival announced that The Church Within lineup (featuring Wino, Greg Rogers and Guy Pinhas) would be reuniting to play their next edition on April 14, 2012. The band later confirmed they would be performing at the Hellfest Open Air 2012. The band performed yet another reunion show at Maryland Death fest XI in May 2013 featuring Wino, Greg Rogers and Reid Raley.

TKO Records re-released the self-titled 7" on November 23, 2012.

Wino announced the full-time return of the Obsessed in March 2016 and the band's official signing to Relapse Records to record the follow-up to The Church Within. The new lineup originally consisted of Spirit Caravan bassist Dave Sherman and Wino's longtime friend and former road crew member Brian Costantino (drums). On October 31, 2016, Wino announced that The Obsessed would test the waters for the remainder of 2016 by adding Bruce Falkinburg on bass and Seraphim on guitar, making this the first time in over 35 years that the Obsessed have been a four-piece band.

In April 2017, the band released Sacred, their first studio album in 23 years. Their next album, Gilded Sorrow, was released on February 16, 2024.

In July 2025, the band announced the departure of drummer Brian Constantino and the addition of new drummer Bob Pantella of Monster Magnet and The Atomic Bitchwax.

In June 2026, The Obsessed announced that they are working on a new album, titled Live Fast – Love Hard – Die Free, which is tentatively due for release in 2027.

== Members ==
Current

- Scott "Wino" Weinrich – lead guitar, lead vocals (1980–present)
- Chris Angleberger – bass (2022–present)
- Jason Taylor – rhythm guitar (2022–present)
- Bob Pantella – drums (2025–present)

Former

- Vance Bockis – vocals (1979–1983)
- John Reese – rhythm guitar (1979–1982)
- Mark Laue – bass (1979–1986)
- Scott Reeder – bass (1990–1992)
- Guy Pinhas – bass (1992–1995)
- Reid Raley – bass (2013–2015, 2017–2019)
- Dave Sherman – bass, backing vocals (2016); died 2022
- Bruce Falkinburg – bass, backing vocals (2016); died 2022
- Brian "Wendy" White – bass (2019–2022)
- Dave Williams – drums (1979–1983)
- Ed Gulli – drums (1984–1986)
- Greg Rogers – drums (1990–1995)
- Brian Costantino – drums, backing vocals (2016–2025)

== Discography ==
=== Demos ===
- Demo 1980
- Demo 1982
- Promo Demo 1985

=== Albums ===
- The Obsessed (Hellhound Records, 1990)
- Lunar Womb (Hellhound Records, 1991)
- The Church Within (Hellhound Records/Columbia Records, 1994)
- Sacred (Relapse Records, 2017)
- Gilded Sorrow (Ripple Music, 2024)
- Live Fast – Love Hard – Die Free (2027)

=== EPs and singles ===
- Sodden Jackal 7" (Invictus Records, 1983)
- "Streetside" 7"/CD (Columbia Records, 1994)
- "To Protect and to Serve" 7"/CD (Columbia Records, 1994)
- Altamont Nation 7" (Bong Load Records, 1995)
- Instrumental 7" (Doom Records, 1996)
- Sodden Jackal 7" (with different mixes) (Doom Records, 1996)
- Split 7" with Mystick Krewe of Clearlight (both sides Lynyrd Skynyrd covers) (Southern Lord Records, 2001)
- Sodden Jackal 7" (TKO Records, 2012)

=== Compilation and live albums ===
- History of The Obsessed (Doom Records, 1997)
- Live at the Wax Museum (Doom Records, 1997)
- Incarnate (Southern Lord Records, 1999)
- The Obsessed reissue w/live '84 CD (Tolotta Records, 2000)
- History of The Obsessed Volume II (Doom Records, 2002)
