= Revelation (band) =

American doom metal band

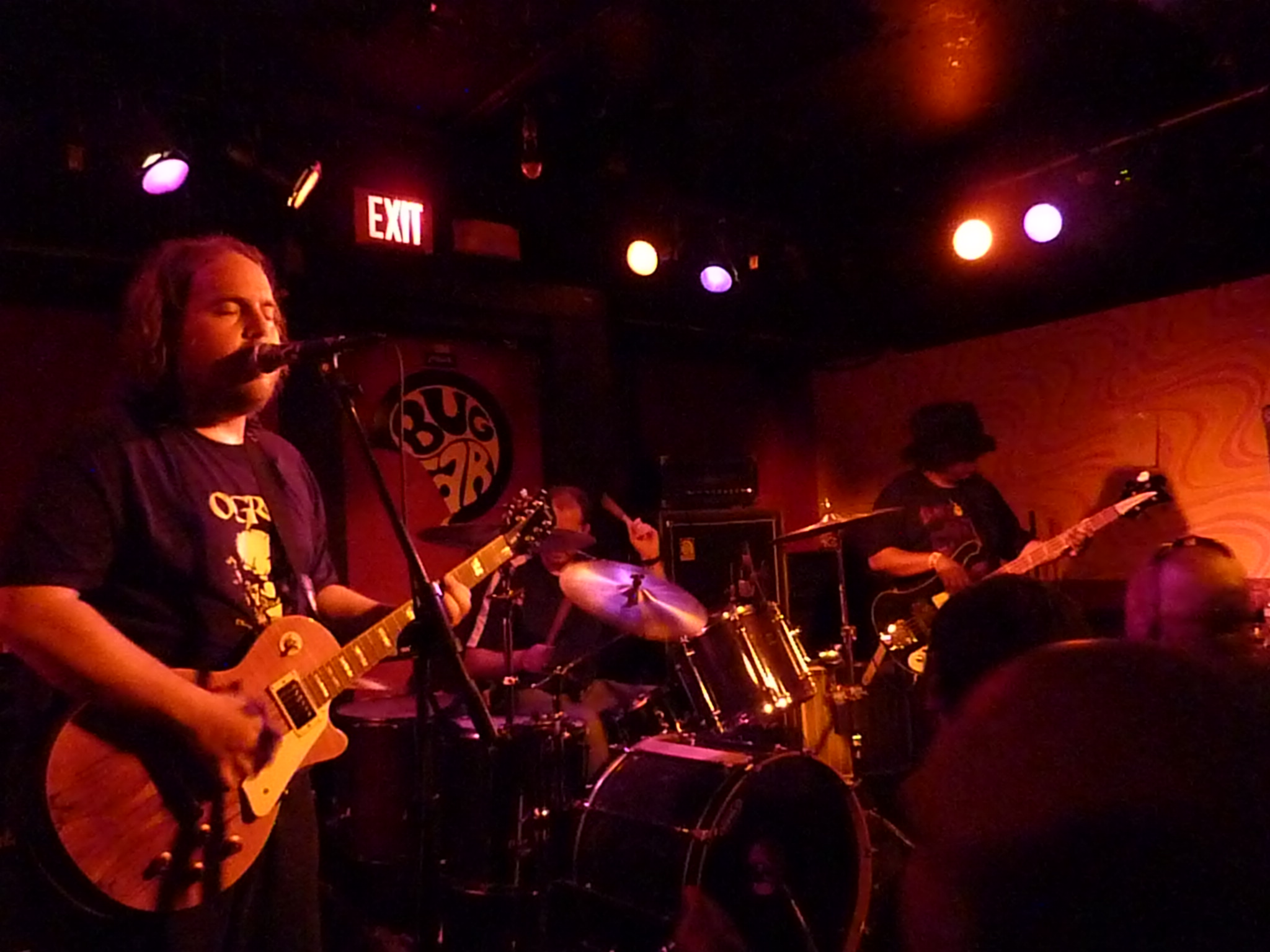
- Revelation performing in 2009

Background information
- Origin: Baltimore, Maryland, U.S.
- Genres: Doom metal, progressive metal
- Years active: 1986–1996; 2003–present
- Labels: Hellhound, Rise Above, Miskatonic, Leaf Hound
- Members: Steve Branagan; Bert Hall; Josh Hart
- Past members: John Brenner; Dennis Cornelius; Jim Hunter
- Website: revelation-usa.net

Revelation is an American doom metal band from Maryland, United States.

== Biography ==
Revelation started in 1986 by singer/guitarist John Brenner and drummer Steve Branagan. After numerous demos they were featured on Rise Above Records compilation Dark Passages. They put out one album with Rise Above before signing with Hellhound Records. They put out two albums with Hellhound before breaking up. In 2003 Miskatonic Records released Frozen Masque, which featured two demos from 1996 as well as live material. The band has played numerous shows since 2003.

In 2004, the 1991 lineup of Revelation reformed under the name Against Nature. From 2005 to 2008 Against Nature self-released several albums via their own label Bland Hand Records. The band then reverted to the name Revelation.

In 2007, Leaf Hound Records re-released Never Comes Silence and announced plans to reissue both Salvation's Answer and an unreleased album. Also in 2007, past line-ups performed at Baltimore's Doom or Be Doomed festival. Several weeks after the Doom or be Doomed Festival Revelation reformed with a "new' line up including John Brenner on guitars and vocals, Josh Hart on guitars, Bert Hall, Jr on bass guitar, and Steve Branagan on Drums. In addition, Brenner, Hall and Branagan will continue to release music and tour as Against Nature.

In 2008, Revelation released their fourth album, Release, their first new full-length in 14 years, which Shadow Kingdom Records licensed. In 2011 the band's ...Yet So Far-era lineup, with guitarist and singer Dennis Cornelius, played Germany's Hammer of Doom festival in Würzburg under the name Yet So Far.

Brenner, Hall and Branagan also recorded as Against Nature, issuing at least 17 full-length albums between 2005 and 2012, while Revelation released four albums between 2008 and 2012. For the Sake of No One came out late in 2009, and Inner Harbor, the band's seventh full-length, followed in 2012 as a free download through the band's own Bland Hand label, with a CD to follow on Shadow Kingdom.

Shadow Kingdom also reissued ...Yet So Far and Never Comes Silence, the latter on CD with a live show as bonus material.

On July 31, 2026, John Brenner died from stomach cancer.

== Discography ==
=== Albums ===
- Salvation's Answer (1991; reissued 2007)
- Never Comes Silence (1992; reissued 2007)
- ...Yet So Far (1995)
- Frozen Masque (2003)
- Unreleased Album (2008; recorded in 1988)
- Release (2008)
- For the Sake of No One (2009)
- Inner Harbor (2012)

As Against Nature

- Appease (2005)
- Panoply (2005)
- Safe Dissonance (2006)
- Ghosting (2006)
- Leer (2006)
- The Anxiety of Influence (2007)
- Unfolded (2007)
- Descend/Much in Little (2008)
