= Doom metal =

Subgenre of heavy metal music

- Stylistic origins: Heavy metal; blues
- Cultural origins: Early to mid 1970s, United Kingdom and United States
- Derivative forms: Post-metal

Subgenres
- Epic doom; traditional doom

Fusion genres
- Black-doom (depressive suicidal black metal); blackened death-doom; death-doom (funeral doom); drone metal; gothic-doom; progressive doom; sludge metal (sludgecore); stoner metal (desert rock)

Regional scenes
- Finland; Pacific Northwest; Louisiana

Local scenes
- Palm Desert Scene; Washington D.C.

Other topics
- Extreme metal; gothic metal

Doom metal is an extreme subgenre of heavy metal music that typically uses slower tempos, low-tuned guitars and a much "thicker" or "heavier" sound than other heavy metal genres. Both the music and the lyrics are intended to evoke a sense of despair, dread, and impending doom. The genre is strongly influenced by the early work of Black Sabbath, who formed a prototype for doom metal. During the first half of the 1980s, a number of bands such as Witchfinder General and Pagan Altar from England, American bands Pentagram, Saint Vitus, the Obsessed, Trouble, and Cirith Ungol, and Swedish band Candlemass defined doom metal as a distinct genre.

== Characteristics ==
=== Instrumentation ===
The electric guitar, bass guitar, and drum kit are the most common instruments used to play doom metal (although keyboards are sometimes used), but its structures are rooted in the same scales as in blues. Guitarists and bassists often down tune their instruments to very low notes and make use of large amounts of distortion, thus producing a very "thick" or "heavy" guitar tone, which is one of the defining characteristics of the genre. Along with the usual heavy metal compositional technique of guitars and bass playing the same riff in unison, this creates a loud and bass-heavy wall of sound. Another defining characteristic is the consistent focus on slow tempos, and minor tonality with much use of dissonance (especially in the form of the tritone), employing the usage of repetitive rhythms with little regard to harmonic progression and musical structure.

=== Vocals ===
Traditional doom metal vocalists favor clean vocals, which are often performed with a sense of despair, desperation, or pain; imitating the high-tone wails of Ozzy Osbourne (Black Sabbath), Frank Ferrara (Bang), Bobby Liebling (Pentagram), and Zeeb Parkes (Witchfinder General). So-called "epic doom" vocalists often take it a step further, singing in an operatic style. Doom metal bands influenced by other extreme metal genres often use growled or screamed vocals, as is the case of death-doom, black-doom, and funeral doom.

=== Lyrical themes ===
Lyrics in doom metal play a key role. Influenced by notable blues musicians like Robert Johnson and Son House, normally they are gloomy and pessimistic, including themes such as suffering, depression, fear, grief, dread, death, and anger. While some bands write lyrics in introspective and personal ways, others convey their themes using symbolism – which may be inspired by occult arts and literature.

Some doom metal bands use religious themes in their music. Trouble, one of the genre's pioneers, were among the first to incorporate Christian imagery. Others have incorporated occult and pagan imagery. For many bands, the use of religious themes is for aesthetic and symbolic purposes only. Examples include lyrics/imagery about the Last Judgment to invoke dread, or the use of crucifixes and cross-shaped headstones to symbolize death.

Furthermore, some doom metal bands write lyrics about drugs or drug addiction. This is most common among stoner doom bands, who often describe hallucinogenic or psychedelic experiences.

== History ==
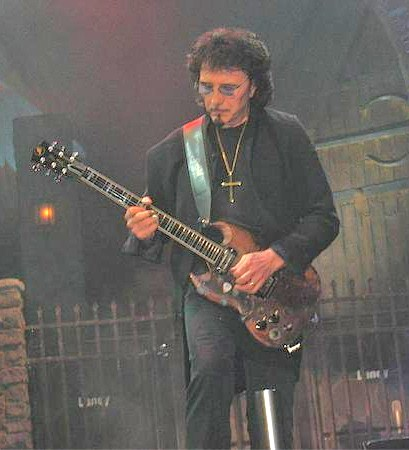
Tony Iommi's guitar style greatly influenced and defined doom metal.

=== Origins (late 1960s–1970s) ===
The first traces of doom in rock music could be heard as far back as the Beatles' 1969 track "I Want You (She's So Heavy)". Black Sabbath are generally regarded as the progenitors of doom metal. Black Sabbath's music is (in and of) itself stylistically rooted in blues, but with the deliberately doomy and loud guitar playing of Tony Iommi, and the then-uncommon dark and pessimistic lyrics and atmosphere, they set the standards of early heavy metal and inspired various doom metal bands. In the early 1970s, both Black Sabbath and Pentagram (also as side band "Bedemon") composed and performed this heavy and dark music, which would in the 1980s begin to be known and referred to as doom metal by subsequent musicians, critics and fans. Joe Hasselvander, Pentagram's drummer also cited bands like Black Widow, Toe Fat, Iron Claw, Night Sun, and Zior as pioneers of the doom metal sound.

Aside from Pentagram and Black Sabbath, other groups from the 1970s would heavily influence the genre's development. Blue Cheer is often hailed as one of the first stoner metal bands. Through the use of loud amplifiers and guitar feedback, their debut Vincebus Eruptum created a template for other artists to follow. Uriah Heep released "Demons and Wizards" album include "Easy Living" in 1972. Though lacking the pessimistic lyrical content of their contemporaries, Welsh heavy metal band Budgie would also produce heavy songs which were amongst the loudest of their day, stylistically influencing various doom metal acts. Led Zeppelin's No Quarter is considered as one of the earliest examples of a doom metal song made by a rock band. Early doom metal was also influenced by Japanese psychedelic rock albums, such as Kuni Kawachi & Friends' Kirikyogen and Flower Travellin' Band's Satori. Bang's 1971 self-titled debut is considered an important forerunner to doom metal. Other notable groups include Sir Lord Baltimore, Buffalo, Necromandus, Lucifer's Friend, and Leaf Hound.

=== Development (1980s) ===
During the early-mid-1980s, bands from England and the United States contributed much to the formation of doom metal as a distinct genre. In 1982, English pioneers Witchfinder General released their debut album Death Penalty. During 1984, two American pioneers also released their debuts – Saint Vitus released their eponymous album and Trouble released Psalm 9. That same year, American band Cirith Ungol (formed in 1971) released their second studio album, King of the Dead – regarded by many as an early influence on doom. The following year, American band Pentagram would go on to release their debut, Relentless. The Swedish Candlemass would also prove influential with their first record Epicus Doomicus Metallicus in 1986, from which epic doom metal takes its name. Pentagram, Saint Vitus, Trouble and Candlemass have been referred to as "the Big Four of Doom Metal".

Some doom metal bands were also influenced by the underground gothic rock and post-punk scene of the 1980s, showing similarities with the dark themes addressed through lyrics and the atmosphere both music styles deal with. A doom metal band like Mindrot was often described as a cross-over between death metal and gothic rock.

== Regional scenes ==
Like other extreme metal genres, doom metal also has regionally based scenes, with their own particular characteristics:

=== Finnish doom metal ===
In one of the greatest doom metal outputs, Finnish groups focus more on the depressive mood of the genre, evoking an intense grieving feeling. The bands play with very slow tempos and melodic tones, creating an atmosphere of darkness and melancholia. This scene was kick-started by the band Rigor Mortis (which, due to an older US band with the same name, changed their name to Spiritus Mortis), which originated in 1987. Notable bands include Reverend Bizarre, Minotauri, Dolorian, Shape of Despair, Thergothon, Skepticism, and Unholy.

=== Louisiana doom metal ===
Regarded as sludge metal's birthplace by AllMusic, this scene originated in New Orleans in the late 1980s. The bands of this scene employ some punk influences, like harsh vocals, guitar distortion and downtuned sound. This scene was pioneered by Exhorder, who was the first band to combine doom metal with a punk-influenced metal sound. In the 90s, several sludge and stoner metal bands arose in the state, mainly influenced by bands like Black Sabbath and Melvins, also mixing their sound with genres like hardcore punk and Southern rock. Notable bands include Eyehategod, Down, Exhorder, Crowbar, and Acid Bath.

=== Washington D.C. doom metal ===
This scene formed in the early 1970s and was kickstarted by Pentagram and the Obsessed. Various doom/stoner bands, mostly from Washington, D.C., and its metropolitan area on Maryland and Virginia (thus also being labelled "Maryland doom sound"), formed in this region being heavily influenced by early hard rock and heavy metal bands, like UFO, Blue Cheer, Black Sabbath, Uriah Heep and Sir Lord Baltimore. This scene is also known as "Hellhound sound" for being closely related to the late Hellhound Records, who signed with many important bands of the scene like Saint Vitus, Internal Void, Iron Man, Revelation, Wretched and Unorthodox. Other notable bands include Evoken, Spirit Caravan, Earthride, and the Hidden Hand.

=== Pacific Northwest doom metal ===
The Pacific Northwest region – primarily Oregon, Washington, and British Columbia – has been host to a growing scene of doom, sludge, and stoner metal since the 1990s. It is influenced by the geographical origin of grunge music and a sound pioneered in part by the Washington band Melvins. Common visual themes include the region's cold, rainy, forested climate, and many bands utilize psychedelic imagery influenced by bands like Sleep, Karp and Harkonen. Musical styles often share crossover features with atmospheric/ambient black metal, drone metal, and post-metal as seen in Oregon's YOB, Agalloch, Witch Mountain, and Red Fang; Washington's Earth, and Sunn O))); and Vancouver's Anciients, Astrakhan, and Aaron Turner project Sumac, among various others.

=== Palm Desert Scene ===
Palm Desert, California, hosts a thriving desert rock and stoner metal scene, drawing heavy influences from psychedelia, blues and hardcore punk, often featuring distinctive repetitive drum beats, a propensity for free-form jamming, and "trance-like" or "sludgy" grooves. Because of their integration, the term "stoner rock" is sometimes used interchangeably with the term "desert rock". Notable bands include Kyuss, Queens of the Stone Age, Dali's Llama, Slo Burn, and Brant Bjork.

== Stylistic divisions ==
=== Black-doom ===
Black-doom, also known as blackened doom, is a style that combines the slowness and thicker, bassier sound of doom metal with the shrieking vocals and heavily distorted guitar sound of black metal. Black-doom bands maintain the Satanic ideology associated with black metal, while melding it with moodier themes more related to doom metal, like depression, nihilism, and nature. They also use the slower pace of doom metal in order to emphasize the harsh atmosphere present in black metal. Examples of black-doom bands include Barathrum, Forgotten Tomb, Woods of Ypres, Deinonychus, Shining, Nortt, Bethlehem, early Katatonia, Tiamat, Dolorian, October Tide, and In the Woods...

==== Depressive suicidal black metal ====
Pioneered by black-doom bands like Ophthalamia, Katatonia, Bethlehem, Forgotten Tomb, and Shining, depressive suicidal black metal, also known as suicidal black metal, depressive black metal, or DSBM, is a style that melds the second wave-style of black metal with doom metal, with lyrics revolving around themes such as depression, self-harm, misanthrophy, suicide, and death. DSBM bands draw the lo-fi recording and highly distorted guitars of black metal, while employing the usage of acoustic instruments and non-distorted electric guitar's timbres present in doom metal, interchanging the slower, doom-like, sections with faster tremolo picking. Vocals are usually high-pitched like in black metal, but lacking of energy, simulating feelings like hopelessness, desperation, and plea. The presence of one-man bands is more prominent in this genre compared to others. Examples of bands include Xasthur, Leviathan, Strid, Silencer, Make a Change... Kill Yourself, and I Shalt Become.

=== Blackened death-doom ===
Blackened death-doom is a genre that combines the slow tempos and monolithic drumming of doom metal, the complex and loud riffage of death metal and the shrieking vocals of black metal. Examples of blackened death-doom bands include Morast, Faustcoven, the Ruins of Beverast, Bolzer, Necros Christos, Harvest Gulgaltha, Dragged into Sunlight, Hands of Thieves, and Soulburn. Kim Kelly, journalist from Vice, has called Faustcoven as "one of the finest bands to ever successfully meld black, death, and doom metal into a cohesive, legible whole."

=== Death-doom ===
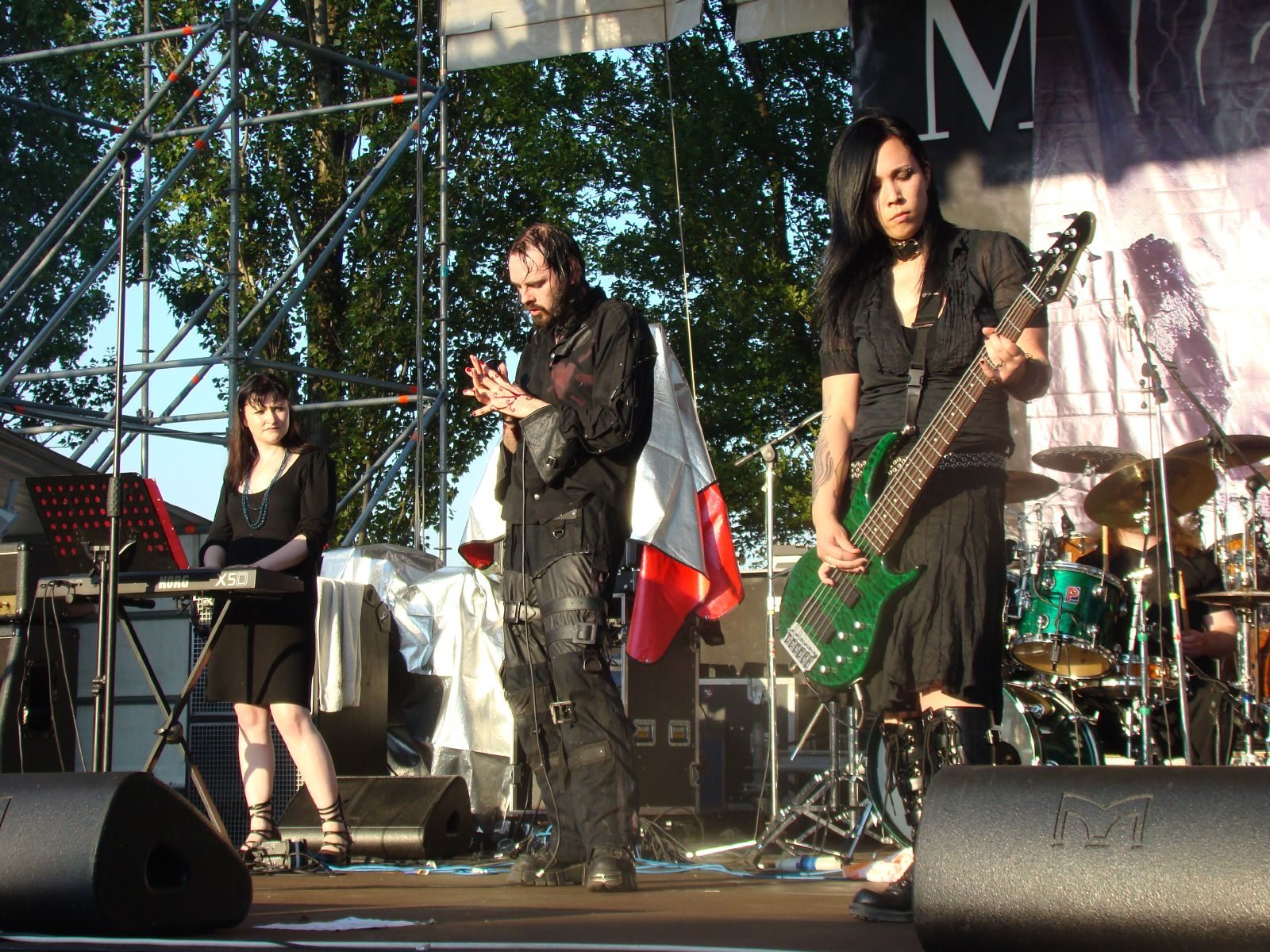
My Dying Bride at Frozen Rock Festival 2007

Death-doom is a style that combines the slow tempos and pessimistic atmosphere of doom metal with the deep growling vocals and double-kick drumming of death metal. Influenced mostly by the early work of Hellhammer and Celtic Frost, the style emerged during the late 1980s and gained a certain amount of popularity during the 1990s. Death-doom was pioneered by bands such as Winter, Disembowelment, Paradise Lost, Autopsy, Anathema, My Dying Bride and Novembers Doom.

==== Funeral doom ====
Funeral doom is a genre that crosses death-doom with funeral dirge music. It is played at an extremely slow tempo, and places an emphasis on evoking a sense of emptiness and despair. Typically, electric guitars are heavily distorted and dark ambient aspects such as keyboards or synthesizers are often used to create a "dreamlike" atmosphere. Vocals consist of mournful chants or growls and are often in the background. Funeral doom was pioneered by Mournful Congregation, Esoteric, Evoken, Funeral, Thergothon, and Skepticism.

=== Drone metal ===
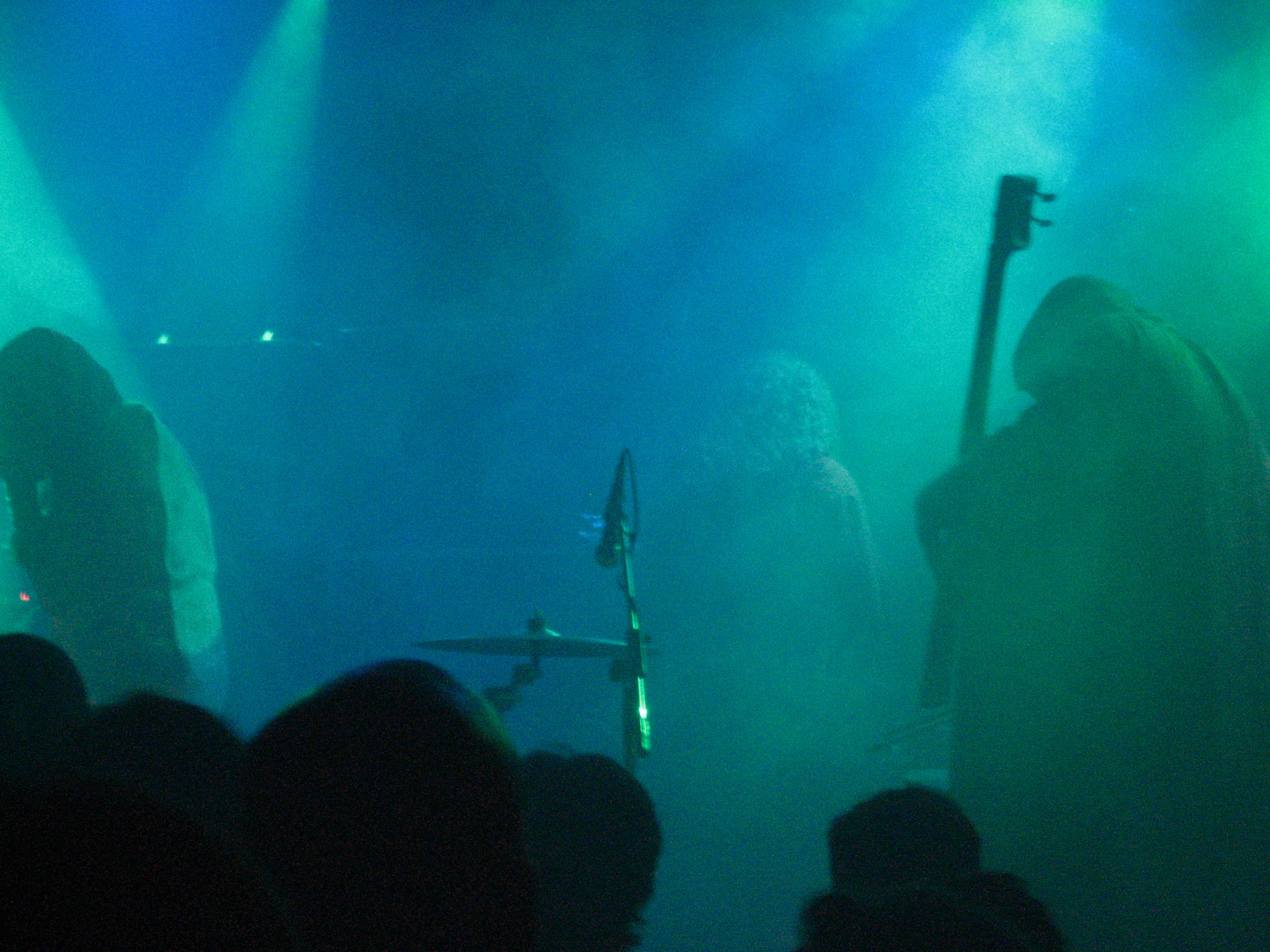
Sunn O))) performing live

Drone metal (also known as drone doom) is a style of doom metal that is largely defined by drones; notes or chords that are sustained and repeated throughout a piece of music. Typically, the electric guitar is performed with large amounts of reverb and feedback while lacking the presence of drums and vocals. Songs are often very long and lack beat or rhythm in the traditional sense. Drone metal is generally influenced by drone music, noise music, and minimalist music. The style emerged in the early 1990s and was pioneered by Earth, Boris, and Sunn O))).

=== Epic doom ===
Epic doom has a heavy classical influence. One of the main characteristics are the vocals; vocalists typically employ clean, operatic, and choral singing, accompanied by keyboarding and drumming performed in a bombastic fashion in order to evoke an "epic" sensation. Lyrics and imagery are typically inspired by fantasy or mythology. Examples of prominent epic doom bands include Candlemass, Solitude Aeturnus, Solstice, While Heaven Wept, and Doomsword.

=== Gothic-doom ===
Gothic-doom, also known as doom-gothic, is a style that combines more traditional elements of doom metal with gothic rock. Gothic-doom bands usually play at slow and mid-tempos and employ the usage of instruments that are more related to classical music, alongside traditional doom metal instruments, in order to create darker and meditative atmospheres. Doom-gothic lyrics combines the dramatic and romantic elements of gothic rock with the sorrowness and melancholy present in doom metal, while being more introspective and focused on personal experiences such as love, grief, irreparable loss, loss of faith, etc. Unlike in gothic metal and death-doom, gothic-doom bands prefer the use of cleaner vocals instead of employing death growls, although some of them employ harsher vocals occasionally, and avoid the usage of death metal-like riffage. Bands labelled as gothic-doom include Weeping Silence, the Foreshadowing, Grave Lines, Artrosis, Ava Inferi, Draconian, and Type O Negative.

=== Progressive doom ===
Progressive doom (also known as technical doom) is a fusion genre that combines elements of progressive rock and progressive metal with doom metal. Some bands in this genre may incorporate elements of death metal, black metal, post-metal, stoner metal, folk metal and gothic metal. Notable bands include King Goat, Below the Sun, Sierra, Oceans of Slumber, Confessor, and Green Carnation.

=== Sludge metal ===
Sludge metal (also known as sludge doom) is a style that combines doom metal and hardcore punk. Many sludge bands compose slow and heavy songs that contain brief hardcore passages. However, some bands emphasise fast tempos throughout their music. The string instruments are heavily distorted and are often played with large amounts of feedback to produce an abrasive, sludgy sound. Drumming is often performed in typical doom metal fashion, but drummers may employ hardcore d-beat or double-kick drumming during faster passages. Vocals are usually shouted or screamed, and lyrics often focus on suffering, drug abuse, politics and anger towards society. The style was pioneered in the late 1980s by the Melvins, and in the 1990s by bands such as Eyehategod, Crowbar, Buzzov*en, Acid Bath, and Grief.

==== Sludgecore ====
Sludgecore further combines sludge metal with hardcore punk, and possesses a slow pace, a low and dark pitch, and a grinding dirge-like feel. Some bands also incorporate Southern rock influences in their sound. Bands regarded as sludgecore include Acid Bath, Eyehategod, Soilent Green, Black Sheep Wall, Admiral Angry, and The Abominable Iron Sloth. Crowbar mixed "detuned, lethargic sludged-out metal with hardcore and southern elements".

=== Stoner metal ===
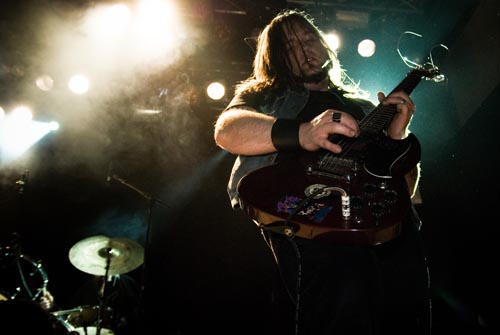
Jus Oborn of Electric Wizard

Stoner metal or stoner doom describes doom metal that incorporates psychedelic rock and acid rock elements. Stoner metal is often heavily distorted, groove-laden bass-heavy sound, making much use of guitar effects such as fuzz, phaser, or flanger. Stoner bands typically play in slow-to-mid tempo, employing the usage of melodic vocals and "retro" production. It was pioneered in the early–mid-1990s by bands such as Kyuss, Sleep, Acid King, Electric Wizard, Orange Goblin, and Sons of Otis.

==== Desert rock ====
Desert rock combines the psychedelic elements of stoner metal with hard rock characteristics. Bands of this style include Kyuss, Fu Manchu, Queens of the Stone Age, Earthlings? and Yawning Man.

=== Traditional doom ===
Influenced by 1970s and 1980s heavy metal, traditional doom metal bands more commonly use higher guitar tunings, and do not play as slowly as many other doom bands. Traditional doom bands typically play slow to mid-tempo songs with a thick and heavy sound with the electric bass following the melody line, and sometimes employ the usage of keyboards, although assuming a secondary role on traditional doom metal songs. Vocals are usually clean with the occasional growl or scream. The lyrics in traditional doom usually are eerie and dark like other doom metal divisions. Some bands who play traditional doom metal are Orodruin, Reverend Bizarre, Witchcraft, Saint Vitus, and Count Raven.

== See also ==
- List of doom metal bands
- Emissions from the Monolith, a doom metal music festival
- Post-metal
- Slowcore, a genre of indie rock that also employs very slow tempos and pessimistic lyrics
- Doomed to Fail, a music history book about the genre and similar styles, such as sludge and post-metal
