= The Skull (band) =

American doom metal band

- Origin: Chicago, Illinois, U.S.
- Genre: Doom metal
- Years active: 2012–present
- Spinoff of: Trouble
- Members: Ron Holzner; Lothar Keller; Rob Wrong; Henry Vasquez
- Past members: Eric Wagner; Kevin Tarpey; Michael Carpenter; Jeff "Oly" Olson; Chuck Robinson; Matt Goldsborough; Sean Saley; Brian Dixon

The Skull is an American doom metal band founded by three former members of Trouble, vocalist Eric Wagner, bassist Ron Holzner, and drummer Jeff "Oly" Olson. It was founded in 2012 in Chicago, Illinois. The band's name is derived from Trouble's second studio album, The Skull.

== History ==
Asked in February 2012 why the three former members of Trouble decided to form The Skull, bassist Ron Holzner replied, "The Trouble set at last year's Days of the Doomed Fest [in Kenosha, Wisconsin] was the catalyst for this whole thing. Eric and Oly hadn't had the chance to talk much before [the festival], and then when I got there the next day and we all got to hang out and talk... it was really nice! Playing "End of My Daze" with the whole f---ing crowd singing... that's what it's all about! We all looked at each other on stage and simply went, 'Wow!'"

In May 2012, Olson departed from The Skull due to his desire to "wait for a real Trouble reunion with original members or not play Trouble's music at all." Kevin Tarpey of Vicious Circle and Two Ton Anvil was recruited to fulfill the obligated show dates and their upcoming European tours. On August 19, 2013, Olson rejoined The Skull stating, "I want to rock again." The Skull performs a large portion of Trouble's first two pioneering doom metal albums, Psalm 9 (1984) and self-titled The Skull (1985), and perform a large catalogue of other Trouble material.

The Skull headlined the Hell's Pleasure festival in Pößneck, Germany in July 2012 alongside NWOBHM band Angel Witch. In late August and early September 2012, The Skull completed a tour of the US east coast and finished that trek by headlining the SHOD Fest (Stoner Hand Of Doom) in New London, Connecticut. The Skull toured Europe in late 2012, including co-headlining the Hammer of Doom festival with the band Pentagram. This European tour also included performances in Germany, Netherlands, Austria, and Sweden, among others.

The Skull have been writing and performing new original material and have scheduled a West coast tour of the US for late 2013. Part of this tour will be headlining the Denver Doom Fest.

On March 5, 2014, former Trouble bassist Chuck Robinson joined the band as the guitarist. Over a month later, it was announced that Robinson had exited the band in order to focus on "his demanding professional career", and former Pentagram guitarist Matt Goldsborough would be his replacement. In 2014, The Skull released their first single, "Sometime Yesterday Mourning," which also had a cover of Trouble's song "The Last Judgment" from the band's 1983 Demo as a b-side.

On August 24, 2014, the band announced that their debut album, titled For Those Which Are Asleep, would be released on November 4 through Tee Pee Records. "A New Generation" was released as a single.

On January 16, 2015, it was announced that drummer Jeff "Oly" Olson departed the band for a second time.

On November 24, 2015, it was announced that guitarist Matt Goldsborough left the band and Witch Mountain guitarist Rob Wrong joined The Skull. The band, with the new lineup, returned to Gunpoint Recording on December 4, 2015, to begin production on the follow-up to For Those Which Are Asleep, to be released through Tee Pee Records. In 2016, The Skull released a five-song self-titled extended play which consisted of studio recordings of "The Longing", "A New Generation," and a re-recording of the Trouble song "The Skull," as well as live recordings of Trouble's "Assassin" and The Skull's "Till the Sun Turns Black."

In September 2018, The Skull released The Endless Road Turns Dark, their second studio album, on Tee Pee Records. Former Cathedral drummer Brian Dixon, who began his tenure with the band after the departure of founding drummer Jeff Olson, can be heard playing on the album. Two singles from The Endless Road Turns Dark, the title track and "Ravenswood," were released during the same year. The Skull released a music video for "The Longing" in 2019.

On August 23, 2021, it was announced that Eric Wagner died of COVID-19 pneumonia.

== Band members ==
Current members

- Lothar Keller – guitar (2012–present)
- Ron Holzner – bass (2012–present)
- Alex Johnson – guitar (2019-present)
- Henry Vazquez – drums (2019-present)

Former members

- Eric Wagner – vocals (2012–2021) (died 2021)
- Michael Carpenter – guitar (2012–2014)
- Kevin Tarpey – drums (2012–2013)
- Jeff "Oly" Olson – drums (2012, 2013–2015)
- Matt Goldsborough – guitar (2014–2015)
- Chuck Robinson – guitar (2014)
- Sean Saley – drums (2015–2016)

Live musicians

- Willie Max – guitar (2015)

Timeline

== Discography ==
The Skull discography
- Studio albums: 2
- Extended plays: 1
- Singles: 5
- Music videos: 1

=== Studio albums ===
- For Those Which Are Asleep (2014)
- The Endless Road Turns Dark (2018)

=== Extended plays ===
- The Skull (2016)

=== Singles ===
- "Sometime Yesterday Mourning" (2014)
- "The Longing" (2016)
- "A New Generation" (2016)
- "The Endless Road Turns Dark" (2018)
- "Ravenswood" (2018)

=== Music videos ===
- "The Longing" (2019)
