= The Skull (album) =

Studio album by Trouble
- Released: April 15, 1985
- Recorded: 1985
- Studio: Preferred Studios (Woodland Hills, Los Angeles); Track Record Studios (Los Angeles)
- Genre: Doom metal
- Length: 43:01
- Label: Combat, Metal Blade
- Producer: Trouble, Bill Metoyer, Brian Slagel

Trouble chronology
Psalm 9 (1984)	The Skull (1985)	Run to the Light (1987)

Professional ratings
Review scores
Source	Rating
AllMusic	3/5 stars
Blistering	(favourable)
Collector's Guide to Heavy Metal	8/10
Rock Hard	9/10

The Skull is the second studio album by the American doom metal band Trouble, released by Combat and Metal Blade Records on April 15, 1985.

Trouble gained critical recognition for The Skull and it was followed by a successful tour. The album reflected singer Eric Wagner's struggles with substance abuse, however, as well as growing turmoil within the group. This led to the departure of bassist Sean McAllister in 1986; he was replaced by Ron Holzner during that year, who would remain with the band until their 2002 reunion. In early 1986, shortly after The Skull tour began, drummer Jeff Olson would also leave to pursue higher education and the band regrouped with a new lineup later that year. Olson would play the Hammond organ on Trouble's third studio album, Run to the Light, in 1987 and keyboards on their 1990 self-titled album, eventually fully reuniting with the band in 1993. Olson played on Trouble's sixth and seventh studio albums, Plastic Green Head and Simple Mind Condition, released in 1995 and 2007, respectively, before leaving the band again in 2008.

The Skull has been released on CD on several occasions: in 1990 by Enigma Records; in 1991 by Metal Blade Records, both by itself and bundled with Trouble's 1984 debut album Psalm 9; remastered and reissued by Escapi Music on October 24, 2006 with a bonus DVD containing concert footage of the band from 1985 at Malo's in Aurora, Illinois; and remastered and reissued by Hammerheart Records, cooperating alongside Trouble, Inc., on May 20, 2020.

== Recording ==
The Skull was recorded in 1985 at two studios, Preferred Studios and Track Record Studios, both located in Los Angeles, California; the band previously recorded their first studio album, Psalm 9, at Track Record Studios in February 1984. Trouble's first demo, 1980 Demo, had a track named "Demon's Claw," an early recording of what would later become the song "Fear No Evil," along with two other songs, "Dying Love" and "Child of Tomorrow." The band's second demo, 1982 Demo, included an early recording of the song "Wickedness of Man" and three tracks that would later be re-recorded for Psalm 9. The band's third demo, 1983 Demo, also included "Wickedness of Man" as well as the song "The Last Judgment." Trouble Live was released in 1983 and had live recordings of songs that would appear on several of the band's studio albums, including four tracks that would later be on The Skull. During a February 2021 interview with Trouble guitarist Bruce Franklin, he stated about The Skull, "We had to mix the whole album in about 8 hours". In June 2021, producer and engineer Bill Metoyer said about The Skull that Trouble had grown "in both musicianship and songwriting" when compared to Psalm 9.

== Songs ==
The Skull, like Trouble's debut album, is significantly Bible-based for the lyrics and song titles. Ephesians 4:31-32 is on the album's back cover. The song title "Gideon" is a reference to Gideon from the Hebrew Bible's Book of Judges. "The Wish," lyrically, appears to be based on Psalm 13:2-3 and Psalm 94:17-19, while the song title "Wickedness of Man" is likely a reference to Proverbs 6:12. The title for "Fear No Evil" is from a section in Psalm 23:4. The album's title track, which begins with a reference to the Eucharist from Matthew 26:26-28, is about the crucifixion of Jesus Christ.

== Track listing ==
All tracks are written by Trouble.

Side One
No.	Title	Length
1.	"Pray for the Dead"	5:51
2.	"Fear No Evil^{[a]}^{[b]}"	4:11
3.	"The Wish^{[b]}^{1}"	11:33

Side Two
No.	Title	Length
4.	"Truth Is – What Is^{[c]}"	4:35
5.	"Wickedness of Man^{[b]}^{[d]}"	5:45
6.	"Gideon^{[b]}"	5:09
7.	"The Skull"	5:53
Total length:		43:01

^{a} Previously recorded under the song name "Demon's Claw" on 1980 Demo.
^{b} Live recording previously appeared on Trouble Live (1983).
^{c} Song not included on the 1991 CD bundled with Psalm 9.
^{d} Early recording previously appeared on 1982 Demo and 1983 Demo.

Bonus DVD

1. "Bastards Will Pay"
2. "Fear No Evil"
3. "Truth Is – What Is"
4. "Revelation (Life or Death)"
5. "Psalm 9"
6. "The Last Judgment"
7. "Assassin"
8. "Pray for the Dead"
9. "Heart Full of Soul" (The Yardbirds cover)
10. "Endtime" (Instrumental)
11. "Run to the Light"
12. "The Tempter"
13. "Wickedness of Man"
14. "The Skull"
15. "Children of the Grave" (Black Sabbath cover)
16. "Tales of Brave Ulysses" (Cream cover)

== Personnel ==
Trouble

- Eric Wagner – vocals
- Bruce Franklin – guitars
- Rick Wartell – guitars
- Sean McAllister – bass
- Jeff Olson – drums

Production

- Bill Metoyer – producer, engineer
- Brian Slagel – executive producer
- Gary Docken – cover artwork
- Eddie Schreyer – mastering at Capitol Records in Hollywood, California (original version)
- Erwin Hermsen – remastering at Toneshed Recording Studio in The Netherlands (2020 version)

== Notes ==
^{1.} "The Wish" is split between two parts as "Death Wish 1" and "Death Wish 2" on Trouble Live (1983).
