= Rob Wrong =

American rock guitarist (born 1970)

- Origin: Portland, Oregon, US
- Genres: Heavy metal; doom metal
- Years active: 1992–present
- Member of: The Skull; Witch Mountain
- Formerly of: Iommi Stubbs

Rob Wrong (born October 28, 1970 in Fairbanks, Alaska) is an American rock guitarist known for playing in Witch Mountain and The Skull. He was described by Premier Guitar as creating "titanic guitar sludge".

== Career ==
Wrong began playing music with punk rock group M-99 and the sludge metal band Iommi Stubbs before forming Witch Mountain in 1997. In 2009, he shifted to playing purely lead guitar for Witch Mountain after they hired singer Uta Plotkin. This led to appearances at notable festivals such as Roadburn Festival, South by Southwest and Hellfest, as well as tours with Danzig, Superjoint, Yob, Enslaved and Hawkwind. In 2015, he was invited by Eric Wagner to perform with The Skull, whom have since toured with Saint Vitus and have performed at Roadburn, Muskel Rock, Psycho Las Vegas and Hellfest.

== Discography ==
=== With M-99 ===
- Grown Up! b/w Big Empty Space (single, 1993)

=== With Iommi Stubbs ===
- Rockandrollodor (1997)

=== With Witch Mountain ===
- Homegrown Doom (demo, 1999)
- ...Come the Mountain (2001)
- Metal Swim (Adult Swim compilation, 2010)
- South of Salem (LP 2011, CD 2012)
- Let It Rain (Oregon Historical Society compilation, 2012)
- Witch Mountain EP (2012)
- Cauldron of the Wild (2012)
- Mobile of Angels (2014)
- Burn You Down b/w Hare's Stare (single 2016)
- Witch Mountain (2018)

=== With The Skull ===
- The Skull EP (2016)
- The Endless Road Turns Dark (2018)
