= Simple Mind Condition =

Studio album by Trouble
- Released: April 3, 2007 (Europe)
- Recorded: 2002–2006
- Studio: Mars Recording Compound, Cleveland, Ohio and Alfa Sound Services, Geneva, Illinois
- Genre: Doom metal, heavy metal, stoner rock
- Length: 46:09
- Label: Escapi Music
- Producer: Vincent Wojno and Trouble

Trouble chronology
Plastic Green Head (1995)	Simple Mind Condition (2007)	Unplugged (2007)

Professional ratings
Review scores
Source	Rating
AllMusic	3/5 stars
Blabbermouth.net	6/10
Chronicles of Chaos	8/10
Metal Forces	8.5/10

Simple Mind Condition is the seventh studio album by American doom metal band Trouble. It was the band's first full-length studio release in twelve years, the longest gap between Trouble's studio albums to date; the band's previous album, Plastic Green Head, was released in 1995. The album is dedicated to former drummer Barry Stern, who died in 2005. To date, this is Trouble's last release with vocalist Eric Wagner and drummer Jeff Olson, who both left in 2008. Wagner died in 2021.

Writing and recording sessions for the follow-up to Plastic Green Head lasted from 2002 to 2006, making it the longest time Trouble have ever spent making a record. Its release had been delayed several times before officially coming to fruition in 2007. It was released on April 3, 2007 in Europe and September 1, 2009 in North America.

A tentative title for the album was Seven, but the title was eventually scrapped.

== Composition and recording ==
After playing a number of reunion shows in early 2002, Trouble commenced work a new album, tentatively titled Seven, to be released later that year. In December 2002, the band halted work on the album when it was announced that bassist Ron Holzner had left Trouble for "personal reasons", and was replaced by former This Tortured Soul bassist Chuck Robinson. Trouble was supposed to perform at the House of Blues in Chicago on January 21, 2003, but was this concert was postponed because the band wanted to "concentrate on [writing material for] the new [studio] disc without interruption. [We] will rebook later in the new year," guitarist Rick Wartell explained.

After touring again randomly in 2003, Trouble entered the studio on August 9 to begin recording a seven-track acoustic compilation of their classic material, which would include a brand-new song written by Robinson and singer Eric Wagner, and would only be available on the band's web site. In July 2003, it was reported that Trouble would enter the studio in before the end of the year with producer Vincent Wojno to redo the follow-up to Plastic Green Head. According to Eric Wagner, 15 songs had been written so far for Seven, including "After The Rain", "Seven", "A Bad Situation", "Goin' Home", "Doombox" and "A New Generation". In regards to the album Wagner stated, "It's still heavy, it's still Trouble, maybe a little more modern. It's still us. It's our seventh album and it was going to be seven years since our last album, but now it's going to be a little more."

In January 2004, Wagner told Metal-Rules.com that Seven would not come out until late 2004. Asked in that interview if the album would continue in the same direction as Plastic Green Head, Wagner replied, "Hmm... it's kinda hard to say right now because things tend to change when you are recording the album. I go down to a rehearsal and record the new songs that could be one of these. I just sit there and try to write worst to it, y'know. So if they sound different on there, then they do when we go recording them. All our albums all the time, we never try to write a certain way. It's just how we felt at that particular square at a time. I thought Plastic Green Head was a little more depressing than Manic Frustration. And after the Manic Frustration album we weren't getting along too well in Trouble at all, y'know, and a lot of like drug references were included into the lyrics of Plastic Green Head, 'coz everybody, well at least me, started to party more and get away like I had enough. I just tried to forget about shit. So this new album, Seven, is more like... getting away from that again, you know what I mean? I guess maybe it could be compared to our other albums, maybe the Trouble record could be the one more like that... something like that. The Skull album was depressing, too because we were doing lots of drugs back then. So "End of My Daze" was the beginning of that beginning again, so this new one is kind of the same thing again. So if I had to compare it to any of our stuff, I would say that one maybe. Uh... it's still really hard to say which of our earlier albums I should compare our new stuff to. It's damn difficult."

Also in early 2004, Trouble posted a statement on their website, saying that they were "working on a record deal" and was set to return to the studio in the spring to record the album. However, it was later reported that the band would start recording it in the fall of that year in time for an early 2005 release, as well as reissues of their first two classic albums Psalm 9 and The Skull. In October 2004, Trouble were in negotiations with three different labels about the release of Seven, the band stated "That is playing a big role in why the CD is not available on the site. On the bright side, If they sell it to one of the labels, you may eventually hear Trouble on the radio. Plus, It will still be available in record stores. So let's wish them well and hope for the best."

In June 2005, Trouble announced on their official website that they were back in the studio to "continue the recording of the new CD. Vinny flew back in mid-June to continue production. Bruce (Franklin) and Rick (Wartell) are recording leads at this time. Eric (Wagner) is singing a bit here and there getting melodies and harmonies together. Stage 2 should be finished in a couple of weeks, then they will go in to mix. Still possible to release in 2005. We will see." Around the middle July of that year, the band announced that the album would no longer be called Seven and would be called Simple Mind Condition, which was a tentative title for an acoustic album. On August 23, 2005, it was announced that Trouble would enter the studio on September 1 to resume recording the album for a January 2006 release on their new label Escapi Music.

== Release ==
On November 12, 2005, Trouble posted a message on their official website stating that the music was "finished for the new CD, Simple Mind Condition. It's awesome. Eric will be finished by the end of November 2005 and the release date has been set for March 2006. Samples and promos will be shipped earlier." The band also announced they were "under contract with two labels, one for USA, and one for Europe. This is the date the labels finally can agree on." On March 10, 2006, the band announced on their official website that the band was putting the finishing touches on the album for a June release.

On May 12, 2006, Escapi Music announced a tentative August 22, 2006 release date for Simple Mind Condition. However, the album still did not surface. Months later, it was announced that the album would finally be released on February 20, 2007, but its release date was pushed back one last time to April 3.

In 2022, a remaster of the album was released by Hammerheart Records, which included a second disc containing a concert recording at Klubben Fryshuset in Stockholm, Sweden in November 2003.

== Track listing ==
All songs by Eric Wagner, Bruce Franklin and Rick Wartell, except where noted.

1. "Goin' Home" – 4:02
2. "Mind Bender" – 3:49
3. "Seven" – 4:57
4. "Pictures of Life" – 3:53
5. "After the Rain" – 5:30
6. "Trouble Maker" (Chuck Robinson, Wagner) – 4:07
7. "Arthur Brown's Whiskey Bar" – 4:23
8. "Simple Mind Condition" – 3:41
9. "Ride the Sky" (John Lawton, Peter Hesslien) – 2:46 (Lucifer's Friend cover)
10. "If I Only Had a Reason" – 4:18
11. "Beginning of Sorrows" (Jeff Olson, Wagner) – 4:39

=== Live in Stockholm bonus disc ===
1. "R.I.P." - 5:14
2. "Come Touch the Sky" - 3:13
3. "At the End of My Daze" - 3:39
4. "Plastic Green Head" - 4:02
5. "Fear" - 3:54
6. "Memory's Garden" - 4:33
7. "The Misery Shows (Act II) - 7:14
8. "Psalm 9" - 4:57
9. "Run to the Light" - 9:35
10. "All is Forgiven" - 5:25
11. "Psychotic Reaction" - 4:26
12. "The Skull" - 7:18
13. "Revelation (Life or Death)" - 6:49
14. "The Tempter" - 6:15

== Personnel ==
Trouble

- Eric Wagner – vocals
- Bruce Franklin – guitars
- Rick Wartell – guitars
- Chuck Robinson – bass
- Jeff Olson – drums, piano, French horn

Production

- Vincent Wojno – producer, engineer, mixing
- Bill Korecky, Doug Agee – engineers
- Michael Lind – mastering
