= Plastic Green Head =

Studio album by Trouble
- Released: April 24, 1995 (Europe); January 30, 1996 (US)
- Recorded: 1994–1995
- Studio: Indigo Ranch Studios (Malibu, California) and Fantasy Studios (Berkeley, California)
- Genre: Heavy metal, psychedelic rock, stoner rock
- Length: 46:44 (Europe); 50:52 (US)
- Label: Bullet Proof/Music for Nations (Europe); Century Media (US)
- Producer: Trouble and Vincent Wojno

Trouble chronology
Manic Frustration (1992)	Plastic Green Head (1995)	Simple Mind Condition (2007)

Professional ratings
Review scores
Source	Rating
AllMusic	4/5 stars
Collector's Guide to Heavy Metal	9/10
Rock Hard	9.5/10

Plastic Green Head is the sixth studio album by the American doom metal band Trouble. It was first released on the Music for Nations label in Europe in 1995 and later distributed in the United States by Century Media Records with a bonus track in 1996. The album marked the return of original Trouble drummer Jeff Olson, who left the band in 1986 and returned in 1993. The album contains covers of The Monkees' 1968 track "Porpoise Song" and The Beatles' 1966 song "Tomorrow Never Knows". A promotional disc was released with "The Eye," "Plastic Green Head," and "Hear the Earth" in 1995. Following the release of Plastic Green Head, Trouble went on an extended hiatus after their European tour was canceled. The album was reissued and remastered by Escapi Music in 2006 with a bonus DVD containing concert footage of Trouble on February 21, 1996, in Hamburg, Germany, live video of English rock band Hawkwind, and footage that was included with the 2006 reissue of Trouble's debut album Psalm 9. It was reissued and remastered by Hammerheart Records in 2022.

== Track listing ==
All songs by Eric Wagner, Bruce Franklin and Rick Wartell, except where noted. Although the tracks are listed as above on the cover, tracks 9 and 10 are swapped on the disc.

1. "Plastic Green Head" – 3:34
2. "The Eye" – 4:20
3. "Flowers" – 4:19
4. "Porpoise Song" (Gerry Goffin, Carole King) – 4:40
5. "Opium-Eater" – 4:25
6. "Hear the Earth" – 3:58
7. "Another Day" – 4:52
8. "Requiem" – 4:52
9. "Below Me" – 2:44
10. "Long Shadows Fall" – 3:37
11. "Tomorrow Never Knows" (Lennon–McCartney) – 5:23
12. "Till the End of Time" (Jeff Olson) – 4:08 (US edition bonus track)

Bonus DVD

Trouble concert

1. "The Sleeper"
2. "Fear"
3. "Plastic Green Head"
4. "Opium Eater"
5. "Long Shadows Fall"
6. "Psychotic Reaction"
7. "Children of the Grave" (Black Sabbath cover)

Hawkwind live footage

1. "Song of the Swords" (December 3, 1985)
2. "The Right Stuff" (June 20, 1984)
3. "Master of the Universe" (December 3, 1986)
4. "Ejection (March 9, 1984)

Trouble 1982 footage

1. "Assassin" (music video)
2. "Interview" (part 1)
3. "Psalm 9" (music video)
4. "Interview" (part 2)
5. "Victim of the Insane" (music video)

== Personnel ==
Trouble

- Eric Wagner – vocals
- Bruce Franklin – guitars
- Rick Wartell – guitars
- Ron Holzner – bass
- Jeff Olson – drums

Production

- Vincent Wojno – producer, engineer, mixing
- Eddie Schreyer – mastering at Future Disc in Los Angeles, California
- Jeff Sadowski – cover art
- Toon Van Esch – ganja photo
- Neil Zlozower – band photos
- Andre Verhuysen, Jeff Weller – executive producers
