= Run to the Light =

Studio album by Trouble
- Released: July 15, 1987
- Recorded: March 1987
- Studio: Chicago Recording Company (Chicago, Illinois)
- Genre: Doom metal
- Length: 37:37
- Label: Enigma/Metal Blade
- Producer: Jim Faraci and Trouble

Trouble chronology
The Skull (1985)	Run to the Light (1987)	Trouble (1990)

Professional ratings
Review scores
Source	Rating
AllMusic	3/5 stars
Collector's Guide to Heavy Metal	9/10
Rock Hard	7.5/10

Run to the Light is the third studio album by American doom metal band Trouble, released by Metal Blade Records on July 15, 1987, being the band's last release on that label. It was the band's first album to have Ron Holzner on bass guitar and the only Trouble album with Dennis Lesh on drums. Jeff Olson, who left the band in 1986, played the Hammond organ on the song "The Beginning". Ted Kirkpatrick, who formed the Christian metal band Tourniquet in 1987, played drums during Trouble's tour for the album. A music video was made for the title track.

A remaster, Run to the Light: Expanded Edition, was released on CD, vinyl, and digitally on June 16, 2023. The CD and digital versions of the Expanded Edition include a cover of The Beatles' 1969 single "Come Together", which was originally released on the compilation The Best of Metal Blade Volume 3 in 1988, and three demo songs recorded in 1986.

== Track listing ==
All tracks are written by Eric Wagner, Bruce Franklin, and Rick Wartell except for "Come Together".

Side One
No.	Title	Length
1.	"The Misery Shows"	5:36
2.	"Thinking of the Past"	3:51
3.	"On Borrowed Time"	5:26
4.	"Run to the Light"	6:01

Side Two
No.	Title	Length
5.	"Peace of Mind"	3:02
6.	"Born in a Prison"	4:48
7.	"Tuesday's Child"	3:25
8.	"The Beginning"	5:25
Total length:		37:37

Expanded Edition CD/digital bonus tracks
No.	Title	Writer(s)	Length
9.	"Come Together" (The Beatles cover)	Lennon-McCartney	3:52
10.	"The Misery Shows" (1986 Demo)		5:18
11.	"Thinking of the Past" (1986 Demo)		4:04
12.	"Run to the Light" (1986 Demo)		6:30
Total length:			57:23

== Personnel ==
=== Trouble ===
- Eric Wagner – vocals
- Bruce Franklin – guitars
- Rick Wartell – guitars
- Ron Holzner – bass
- Dennis Lesh – drums

=== Additional musicians ===
- Daniel Long – keyboards
- Jeff Olson – Hammond organ in the song "The Beginning"

=== Production ===
- Jim Faraci, Trouble – producer
- Ian Burgess – engineer
- Scott Hull – painting
- Jack Koshick – management
- John Jezak – photography
- Eddie Schreyer – mastering at Capitol Records in Hollywood, California
