= Jeff Olson (musician) =

American drummer

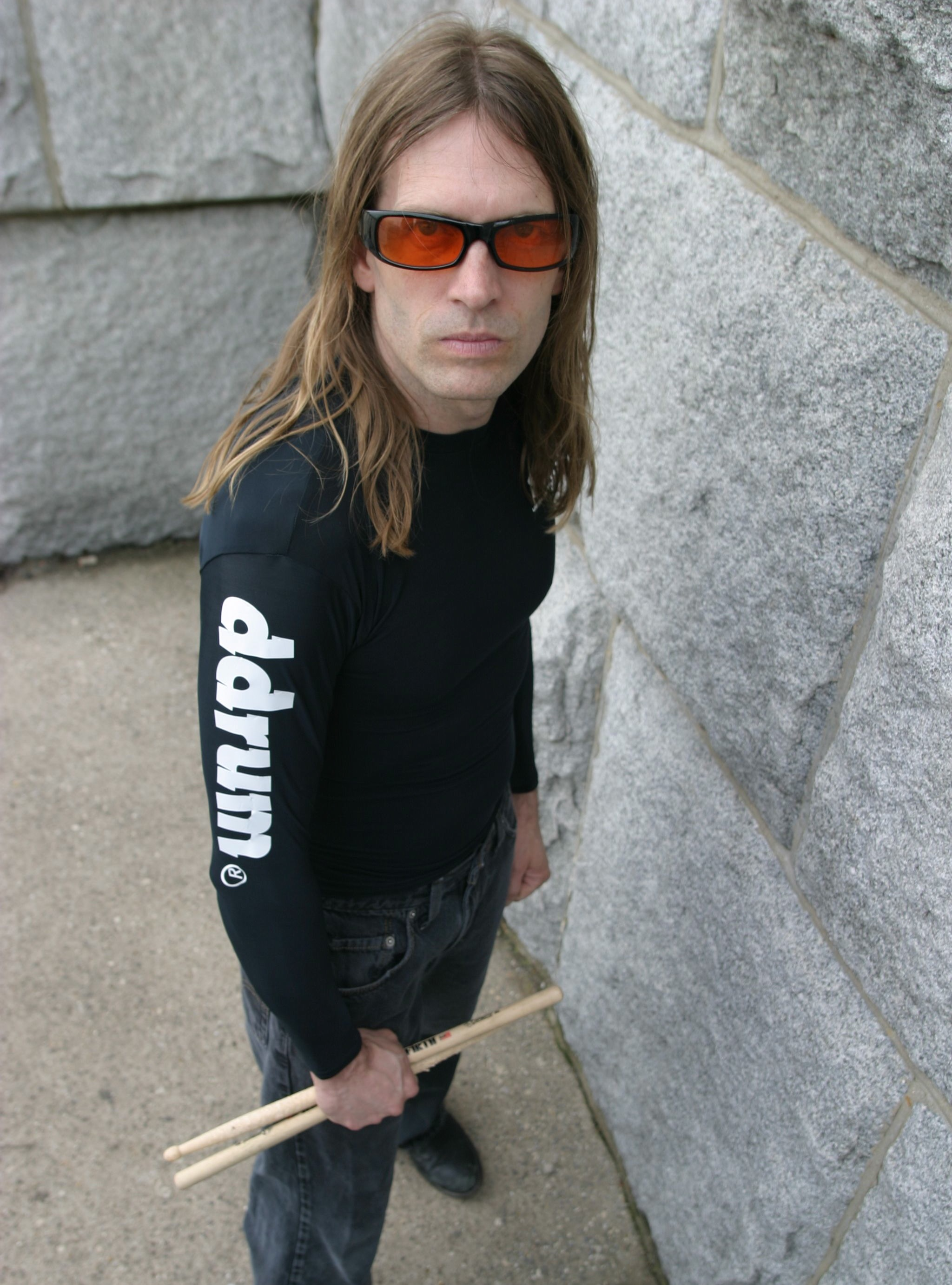

Background information
- Born: July 14, 1962 (age 64); Wareham, Massachusetts, U.S.
- Occupation: Musician
- Instruments: Drums, keyboards, vocals
- Years active: 1975–present
- Website: retrogravemusic.com

Jeff Olson (born July 14, 1962) is an American musician and the original drummer for the doom metal band Trouble. He is also the founding member of Retro Grave, keyboardist for Victor Griffin's In~Graved, proprietor of Upland Recording, and former drummer for The Skull.

== Background ==
Olson was born on July 14, 1962, in Wareham, Massachusetts. He moved to Aurora, Illinois, at age five. He first learned to play the piano at age six and the trumpet at age eight. In 1975, Olson began marching for Drum Corps International (DCI) in the Fox Valley Raiders playing Melephone. In 1977, Olson changed instruments with the Fox Valley Raiders and began playing first soprano bugle. By 1978, he shocked his horn instructors and auditioned and made the snare line until the corps folded that year. Olson then joined the Blue Stars in early 1978, but the drum line was full. He, therefore, marched the season again as first soprano bugle until he joined the band Trouble in 1979. Olson can be seen on the DCI Legacy DVD (front row first soprano bugle side left).

During Trouble's hiatuses he graduated from Berklee College of Music in 1992 with a BM degree in Film Scoring and later composed music for the Borealis Theater Company in Chicago. In 1996, Olson created the "electronic music ensemble" course when he was a teacher of midi and recording techniques at Waubonsee Community College in Aurora, Illinois. The following year, he was commissioned by the Paula Fraz Dance Company in Chicago to arrange and compose original music for the performance of Songs My Mother Sang Me. Olson received the Ruth Page Award for his work on that production.

== Career ==
=== Trouble ===
Following the release of their first two albums, 1984's Psalm 9 and 1985's The Skull, Olson left Trouble in 1986 to teach music while also writing musical scores and later receiving a Bachelor of Music degree in Film Scoring (cum laude) from Berklee College of Music. He returned to the band for the albums Run to the Light (Hammond organ), Trouble (pre-pro for drums, keyboards), Plastic Green Head (drums), Simple Mind Condition (drums, French horn), Unplugged, and Live in LA.

Olson has toured with Trouble since 1979, headlining shows throughout the United States and Europe, as well as performing at numerous music festivals in Europe including the 1995 Dynamo Open Air in the Netherlands. In July 2008, Olson announced his departure from Trouble. His last show with them was at "The End" in Nashville, Tennessee, on July 19, 2008.

On February 16, 2013, Olson announced that he would be playing keys on Trouble's new album The Distortion Field, released 2013.

Songs written for Trouble by Olson

- "Victim of the Insane" - Psalm 9
- Drum parts for "E.N.D." - Trouble
- "Till The End of Time" - Plastic Green Head
- "Beginning of Sorrows" - Simple Mind Condition
- "Intro" - Live in LA

=== Retro Grave ===
In 2006, Olson formed Retro Grave while still the drummer for Trouble. The debut self-titled EP was released on June 5, 2007, and was written, recorded, and performed entirely by Olson alongside lyricist Paull Goodchild. The debut full-length, Again, was released on February 9, 2010, with guest musicians.

Olson is now collaborating again with lyricist Paull Goodchild for the sophomore album, Skullduggery.

=== Other projects ===
In addition to Olson's work with Trouble and Retro Grave, he played drums on the debut Supershine album (the band formed by Doug Pinnick and Trouble guitarist Bruce Franklin). Olson also played drums on Trouble guitarist Rick Wartell's Wet Animal debut album and was involved in pre-production work and recorded percussion for Canticle of the Plains by Rich Mullins.

In 2001, he started his own label, Upland Recording, which released two albums in its first year. One was a children's album, Children's Stories from Around the World, narrated by Marie Fraz. The other was a jazz and classical album, Music to Cook By, compiled from his previous theater work.

On July 5, 2010, Olson premiered an Internet radio show, Heady Metal with Jeff Olson, via Metal Messiah Radio. The show features interviews with musicians from different metal genres across the board, comedic segments, and music news. Olson's first guest was Dave Chandler of Saint Vitus.

In February 2012, Olson started a new band called The Skull with original Trouble vocalist Eric Wagner and former Trouble bassist Ron Holzner. On May 23, 2012, Olson announced his departure from the band stating he will "wait for a real Trouble reunion with original members or not play Trouble's music at all."

On December 20, 2012, Olson announced that he will play Hammond organ on the forthcoming debut album from In-Graved, the new band led by former Pentagram and Place of Skulls guitarist Victor Griffin. Olson is also part of the In~Graved touring line up.

In a press release on August 20, 2013, Olson announced that he had a change of heart and rejoined The Skull, saying "I want to rock again". Olson participated in The Skull's 2014 tour celebrating Trouble's 30th anniversary of their debut record, Psalm 9.

On January 25, 2014, Allagash Brewing Company released a pilot beer called "Red Howes" brewed by Olson. The beer is an Imperial Stout brewed with cranberries and was named after his grandfather who built cranberry bogs in Massachusetts. On the release day, Olson performed an hour of live music at the brewery located in Portland, Maine. A CD was given out with each 750 ML purchase of "Red Howes" that consisted of Retro Grave music, Red Howes gospel music, and stories narrated by Howes.

== Personal life ==
Olson married his personal manager, Leigh Rush, in a private ceremony on Saturday, October 25, 2008.
