= Zoetrope (band) =

American heavy metal band

Zoetrope was an American heavy metal band from Chicago. Although akin to thrash metal, the group described themselves as "Street Metal".

== History ==
The group was formed in 1976 by Barry Stern (drums/vocals), Kevin Michael Rasofsky, (guitar/vocals), and Calvin Humphrey (bass), soon joined by second guitarist Ken Black. Initially playing covers, the band started writing original material and released a single in 1980. Although a metal band, Zoetrope was active in Chicago's hardcore punk scene, sharing bills with local hardcore bands and frequenting punk bar O'Banions. Black and Stern produced the self-titled LP by Chicago-based hardcore band Life Sentence in 1986. Following the release of a couple of demo tapes, the group signed to Combat Records and issued their first LP, Amnesty, in 1985. In 1987, the band recorded their follow up, A Life of Crime, with producer Randy Burns in Los Angeles. During recording, Black left the band and returned to Chicago to sort out substance abuse issues. He was replaced with Louis Svitek. Although Svitek appears on the album cover, Rasofsky later confirmed that Black had finished his guitar parts before leaving. During the tour supporting A Life of Crime, Svitek was recruited for M.O.D. by Billy Milano. After the tour, Stern left to join Chicago band Trouble. Rasofsky returned with a new line up for 1993's Mind Over Splatter, but the band folded soon after.

Svitek later played with Chicago punk band Lost Cause, Ministry, Mind Funk, Pigface, The Hollow steps (featuring Black on a few tracks) and Project 44. He went on to run Wu Li Records, Chicago-based hip-hop label. Stern filled in on drums for a tour with Cathedral, and guested on the self-titled debut by Debris Inc., which featured former members of Saint Vitus and Trouble. Stern died on April 1, 2005, from complications after hip-replacement surgery. He was singing for local band D-Connect at the time of his death. Trouble dedicated their 2007 album, Simple Mind Condition, to his memory. Black passed away on July 18th, 2026.

== Members ==
- Kevin Michael – Guitar/Vocals (1976–1993)
- Ken Black – Guitar (1976–1987)
- Barry Stern – Drums/Vocals (1976–1988)
- Calvin "Willis" Humphrey – Bass (1976–1990)
- Louis Svitek – Guitar (1987–1988)
- Pete Montswillo – Vocals (1988–1993)
- Michael Ray Garrett – Guitar (1988–1993)
- Drew Kristoff – Drums/Vocals (1988–1990)
- Sean Schipper – Drums (1990–1993)
- Erik "Tater" Armstrong – Bass (1990–1993)

== Discography ==
- "The Right Way" b/w "Call 33" 7" (1980, self-released)
- The Metal Log Vol. 1 demo tape (1983, self-released)
- The Metal Log Vol. 2 demo tape (1985, self-released)
- Amnesty LP (1985, Combat Records, reissued on CD with the Metal Log demos as bonus tracks by Century Media in Europe in 1999)
- A Life of Crime LP (1987, Combat Records, reissued on CD with liner notes by Kevin Michael on Century Media in Europe in 1998)
- Mind Over Splatter LP/CD (1993, Grind Core Records/Red Light)
