= Again (Retro Grave album) =

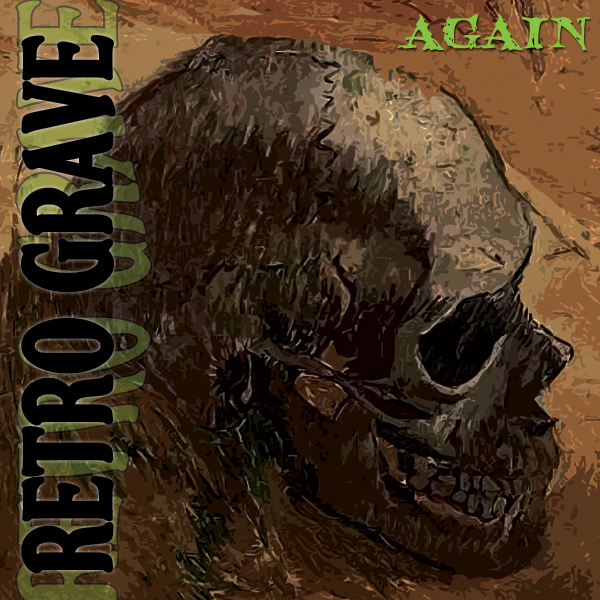
Retro Grave debut full-length cover, 2010

Again is the debut full-length album by rock band Retro Grave. It features original Trouble drummer Jeff Olson. The album was released initially in December 2008 as a download only via the band's website. One month later, Michael Leonard Maiewski was added to the band for strings and back up vocals. A hardcopy of Again was released in February 2010 with Maiewski added to the mix.

== Track listing ==
All music written by Jeff Olson. Lyrics by Paull Goodchild.

1. "Intro"
2. "Monstah"
3. "Lie Quickly Down"
4. "Mind March"
5. "Liar"
6. "Dead Ol Harp"
7. "Belly Crawl"
8. "Bad Train"
9. "So So Souls"
10. "Doldrums"
11. "Abomination"
12. "Entropy"

== Credits ==
- Jeff Olson – vocals, guitar, bass, drums, keyboards, brass
- Paull Goodchild – lyrics
- Michael Leonard Maiewski – guitar
- J. Cortes – bass
- Mike Schermuly – guitar
