= Joaquin Berrios =

American singer

José Joaquín Berrios Corvalán (born November 6, 1967, in Santiago, Chile), is a Chilean–American musician; composer, singer, guitar player, piano player, drummer and record producer. His career has spanned more than three decades starting with the local underground rock scene in Chile during the second half of the 1980s up to the present with his work as a solo artist.

== Career ==
He grew up in Santiago, Chile, and left the country in 1992 to study composition at Berklee College of Music in Boston. He graduated in 1995 cum laude with a bachelor's degree in film scoring, and received his diploma from that year's honorary degree recipients James Taylor and Natalie Cole. In Boston, he formed the alternative Spanish rock band Sofia, with Mexican-American guitarist Joshua Sonntag, bassist Rafols Morales and drummer Raul Ramirez, both from Puerto Rico. They were signed by New York-based record label Big Sur Music and recorded their debut album, Sofia. Produced by Chilean record producer Alvaro Riveros, the album was tracked at Ochoa Studios in Puerto Rico, mixed at The Hit Factory in New York and mastered by Howie Weinberg also in New York. Though this album was never released or distributed, Big Sur Records produced a video for "Tres Palabras", a medley with sections from Osvaldo Farrés original "Tres Palabras" and "Amar y Vivir" for Consuelo Velazquez. The video got medium to heavy rotation in MTV Latino and in The Box.

The band moved to Miami, Florida in 1997 where they played and toured extensively in Florida, Cancun and Guadalajara, Mexico, for three years before dissolving in 2000.

After the band split, Berrios moved back to Chile where he wrote, performed and produced his first solo career album SOLO. The album is a conceptual work with some progressive rock characteristics and influences from Pink Floyd. The album was distributed in Chile by Big Sur Records, now based there, where it was favorably received by the alternative and progressive music community.

The same year, Berrios composed, through a series of improvisations, Ancestros Piano Music Vol. 1. The album made of 13 tracks was dedicated to all of his grandparents.

He came back to Miami, Florida, in 2001, where he formed the band La Flotabanda, a rock ensamble with friends from the local band Tereso; Juan Manuel Rozas on lead guitar and Alejo Rozas on drums, and with Gaston Zukowski from the band The Gardy's on bass. He produced and recorded with former bandmate Rafols Morales, their eponymous album La Flotabanda at Yellow Wings Studios in Miami.

In 2008, Berrios and his wife Micaela Rozas established KZK Records LLC, a record label, web design, music production and audio post company. At KZK's recording studio, Berrios produced local artists such as Eric Wagner and The Tremends. The dissolved band Sofia recorded their second album, Embrujo, and produced "Perro Grande" with school mates Rafols Morales on bass and Rolando Gonzales on drums.

In 2016, after a long musical hiatus, he recorded In the Garden of Eve, a ten-song album with brass and woodwind arrangements. Drums were performed by Phoenix Rivera, saxophone by Michael Sinisgalli, and lead/back female vocals by Joana Hughes. Berrios wrote, produced, arranged, performed (guitars, bass, piano and vocals), recorded and mixed the album. In the Garden of Eve was mastered by Brian Lucey at Magic Garden Mastering Studios. The video for the first single "Crash" was recorded at America Filmworks in Miami, and features Argentinian dancer Andrea Leggieri performing with singer Joana Hughes.

In 2017 Berrios compose an album inspired in the political events that took over life in the United States that year. The album was named 2017 The Year of the Bully and was released in August 2018. Again, Berrios had musicians Phoenix Rivera on drums, Michael Sinisgalli on tenor Sax and Joana Hughes on vocals.

In 2019 Berrios composed Requiem for Utopia. The author was inspired by the social unrest going on in America with president Trump's first impeachment and more specifically by the events happening in his native Chile. This album was also a conceptual one, but this time manly based on piano music. The tracking stage was done at the beginning of the COVID-19 pandemic, limiting the range of instruments and performers involved for safety reasons.

In 2020, Berrios released Rotten Apples From the Garden of Eve. Due to the stay at home orders and social distancing imposed by the fight against the pandemic, Berrios decided to revisit a series of songs coming from the In the Garden of Eve recordings that didn't make the cut and release them as a new album.

In 2024 Berrios released The One. A musical documentary about the presidency of Donald J. Trump 2016–2020. The music was released as an album and also as a long format musical video. The work narrates the main events of said presidential term through the composer's perspective. Once again, Berrios wrote, performed, recorded, mixed and mastered the album.

== Discography ==
- Big Bang... Boom (1991)
- Sofia (1997)
- Sofia Live SB Pub (1998)
- Solo (2001)
- Ancestros_Piano Music Vol. 1 (2001)
- Flotabanda (2001)
- Perro Grande (2006)
- Sofia Embrujo (2008)
- Sofia live at KZK (2008)
- In the Garden of Eve (2016)
- 2017 The Year of The Bully (2018)
- Requiem for Utopia (2020)
- Rotten Apples from the Graden of Eve (2020)
