= Withered =

American extreme metal band

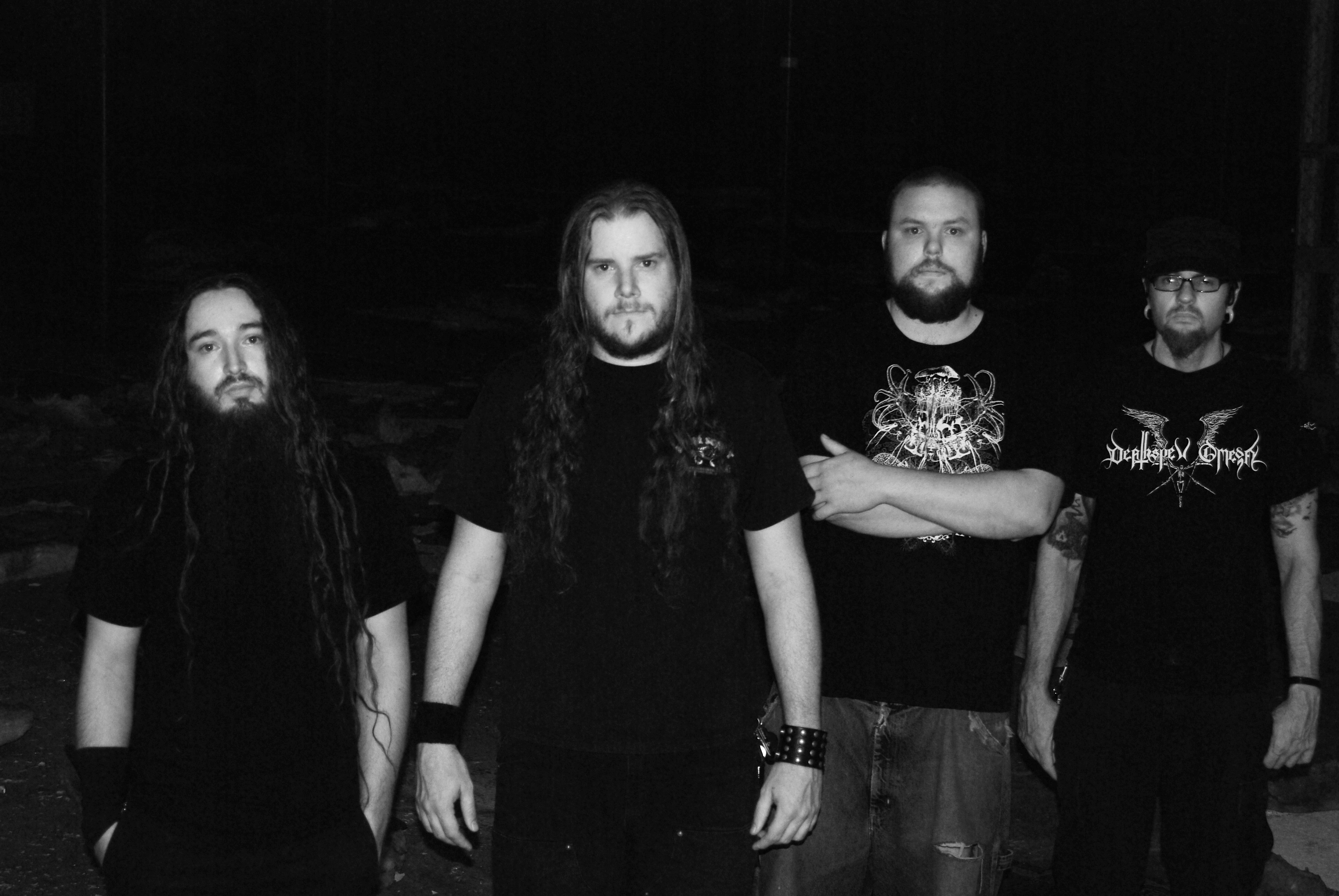
- WITHERED - June 2008

Background information
- Origin: Atlanta, Georgia, United States
- Genres: Death metal, doom metal, black metal, sludge metal
- Years active: 2003 – present
- Labels: Prosthetic Records, Lifeforce Records, Hypertension Records, Season of Mist
- Members: Mike Thompson; Beau Brandon; Ethan McCarthy; Colin Marston
- Past members: Greg Hess; Wes Kever; Alex Tomlin; Herb Jowett; Dylan Kilgore; Mike Longoria
- Website: http://www.withered.net

Withered is an American extreme metal band from Atlanta, Georgia, United States, founded by Mike Thompson and Chris Freeman. Both members also participate in a crust punk/grindcore band Social Infestation, which also features Mastodon bassist Troy Sanders.

== Overview ==
Withered, formed in 2003, have released five full-length albums, Memento Mori (2005 - Lifeforce), Folie Circulaire (2008 - Prosthetic), Dualitas (2010 - Prosthetic), Grief Relic (2015 - Season of Mist) and Verloren (2021 - Season of Mist).

== History ==
Withered was formed as a concept by Mike Thompson and Chris Freeman in 2003. They brought in Wes Kever (drums) and Greg Hess (bass) to complete the lineup and to create Withered's rhythm section. They immediately wrote 5 songs that were recorded (3 of which were released on their self-titled demo).

In 2004, they began performing live and toured the U.S. East Coast extensively.

Withered was signed to Lifeforce Records in 2005 and released Memento Mori, which was produced and recorded by Michael Green. It was well received by critics and fans, and also placed fourth on Decibel magazine's top 40 list as well as many other year end-lists. The release was followed up with a UK tour supporting Mastodon, High on Fire and Bloodsimple in December.

The 2006 U.S. touring cycle began with a string of East Coast and Midwest tours supporting Dismember, Grave and Vital Remains in October. Immediately following the tour, Wes and Greg both left the band since they had both started new families.

Early in 2007, Withered's rhythm section was replaced with Mike Longoria (bass/noise/atmosphere) and Beau Brandon (drums), who had both collaborated on numerous projects for over a decade in the past. Regional touring began almost immediately, and the band started work on their second full-length album between tours with Skeletonwitch and Zoroaster.

Withered entered the studio in February 2008 to record Folie Circulaire with producer Phillip Cope. The album was released in late June to high praise. Withered once again was cited on many year-end lists. They followed up the release with a full U.S. tour as direct support for Sweden's Watain.

Touring continued through 2009 and Withered was featured at the first Scion Festival, the New England hardcore and metal festival, and also at Maryland's Deathfest. Withered supported Mayhem, Cephalic Carnage and Cattle Decapitation in June on a full U.S. tour. In August, they were offered a special mini-tour as direct support for Sweden's Marduk in the Northeast USA. They spent the rest of the year writing their third full-length album that was to be released in the fall of 2010.

Writing continued in early 2010 began for Dualitas, and Withered was showcased at SXSW in Austin, TX in March. They entered The Jam Room studio with producer Phillip Cope in May/June to record Dualitas for a Fall release. At the end of October, they toured six weeks throughout North America to support the album's release. Part of this tour was with Danzig's Blackest Of The Black tour with Danzig, Possessed, Marduk and Toxic Holocaust. That tour was immediately followed up by touring with label mates Skeletonwitch and Landmine Marathon.

In 2012, following a summer tour with Marduk and 1349, Dylan Kilgore left the band to focus on family. 6 months later, Mike Longoria also left the band, moving back home to TX. Thompson and Brandon were joined by Ethan McCarthy (Primitive Man, Clinging to the trees of a forest fire) on guitar and vocal duties in mid 2013. Bass duties on tour were delivered by Zach Harlan (Clinging to the trees of a forest fire) in 2013 on a mini tour with Goatwhore and 3 inches of blood. Following the tour, Thompson and Brandon finished roughing in 8 songs for a new album. Bass was written/recorded by Colin Marston (Dysrhythmia, Krallice, Gorguts) in early 2014. The album, Grief Relic was released in 2016.

In the spring of 2017, Withered supported Morbid Angel and Suffocation along with Revocation on a US tour.

== Reviews ==
"These tracks contain a vast, roaring sea of guitar, and after a while you stop thinking about the artists' hands; it sounds as if it's not made by pale, bearded guys from Atlanta but by forces of weather." - Ben Ratliff for The New York Times

"5.4 of 6 - Folie Circulaire had me riveted from its opening strains to the last moments of its closing Necrophobic cover. . . .Withered are the future of heavy metal." - Doug Moore for MetalReview.com

"4 of 5 stars - [Withered] mixes dense, lurching doom with pummeling blast beats, crafting songs that are as bleak and fraught with palpable tension as a blackened tornado funnel cloud on a distant horizon. The 10 tracks link together seamlessly in a 45-minute-long lesson in abject human misery." - Adem Tepedelen for Revolver magazine

"If you can envision a soundtrack befitting a soul’s slow descent into madness, Withered’s Folie Circulaire would be about as close as you can get." - Alxs Ness for Abort Magazine

"In the very capable hands of Withered, the possibilities for sonic destruction seem limitless and ultimately, a formality." - David E. Gehlke for Blistering.com

"9 out of 10 - Folie Circulaire sounds like a blackened cross between My Bloody Valentine and Morbid Angel." - Rod Smith for Decibel magazine

"With Folie Circulaire, black-metal underdogs WITHERED unleashed the bleakest, most constrictive metal opus Atlanta has seen since Mastodon's Leviathan. Every time the group takes the stage, slow, pulverizing grooves grind, bash and build to a climax of machine gun drums, helicopter head-banging and a bestial growl. While Mastodon was busy cracking the Skye, Withered punched a hole through the earth and reached deep into the bowels of hell to summon an epic, labyrinthine roar." - Creative Loafing Best of 2009

== Lyrical influences ==
Withered has cited Friedrich Nietzsche, C.G. Jung, Georges Bataille, The Marquis de Sade, Arthur Machen and Aleister Crowley as influential thinkers on the group, conceptually.

== Members ==
=== Current ===
- Mike Thompson – guitars, vocals (2003–present)
- Beau Brandon – drums (2007–present)
- Dan Cayedo – guitars, vocals (2018–present)
- Rafay Nabeel – bass (2018–present)

=== Former ===
- Chris Freeman – guitars, vocals (2003–2009)
- Greg Hess – bass (2003–2006)
- Wes Kever – drums (2003–2006)
- Mike Longoria – bass (2007–2013)
- Dylan Kilgore – guitars, vocals (2009–2013)
- Ethan McCarthy – guitars, vocals (2013–2017)
- Zach Harlan – bass (2013–2014)
- Colin Marston – bass (2014–2018)

== Discography ==
=== Studio albums ===
- Memento Mori (2005)
- Folie Circulaire (2008)
- Dualitas (2010)
- Grief Relic (2016)
- Verloren (2021)

=== Demos ===
- 2004 Demo (2004)

=== Other appearances ===
- Metal Swim - Adult Swim compilation album (2010)
