= Psalm 9 (album) =

Studio album by Trouble
- Released: March 1984
- Recorded: February 1984
- Studio: Track Record Studios (Los Angeles, California)
- Genre: Doom metal; Christian metal
- Length: 39:15 (original); 43:15 (reissues)
- Label: Metal Blade
- Producer: Trouble, Bill Metoyer, and Brian Slagel

Trouble chronology
Trouble Live (1983)	Psalm 9 (1984)	The Skull (1985)

Singles from Psalm 9
- 1. "Assassin" / "Tales of Brave Ulysses" Released: 1984

Professional ratings
Review scores
Source	Rating
AllMusic	4.5/5 stars
Blistering	(favourable)
Collector's Guide to Heavy Metal	9/10
Rock Hard	3.0/10
Sea of Tranquility	4/5 stars

Psalm 9 is the debut studio album by American doom metal band Trouble, released by Metal Blade Records in March 1984. The album was originally released eponymously and later renamed to Psalm 9 after the release of the band's fourth studio album, which was their 1990 self-titled release. Along with Saint Vitus' self-titled debut album from the same year, Psalm 9 is considered by many critics to be one of the first doom metal releases.

The album has been released on CD on several occasions: in 1991 by Metal Blade Records, both by itself and bundled with Trouble's second studio album The Skull (1985), one year after the release of then-current album Trouble; remastered using the original master tapes and reissued again by Metal Blade in 1994 to commemorate the tenth anniversary of its release; remastered and reissued by Escapi Music on October 26, 2006 with a bonus DVD containing video footage of the band from 1982; and remastered and reissued by Hammerheart Records, cooperating alongside Trouble, Inc., on May 20, 2020.

== Recording ==
Prior to releasing their debut album, Trouble recorded several demos shortly after forming in 1979. The band recorded an early version of the song "The Fall of Lucifer" in 1981. The band's second demo, 1982 Demo, contained early recordings of the songs "The Tempter," "Revelation (Life or Death)," and "Assassin," with Ian Brown performing bass guitar. In 1983, Trouble recorded a concert in Aurora, Illinois at The Beat Club on tape, Trouble Live, during which they performed songs that would appear on several of their studio albums, including seven tracks that were later recorded on Psalm 9. The cassette version of Trouble Live was released in 1983 by Midwest Heavy Metal Promotion with 100 tapes being pressed; it was later released on vinyl by High Roller Records in 2011, being limited to 500 copies, and on CD by Trouble on their label Trouble, Inc.

Psalm 9 was mixed and recorded at Track Record Studios in Los Angeles, California in February 1984. Trouble guitarist Rick Wartell said in April 2013 that the recording of the album was done, "in a week including mixes." In June 2021, producer and engineer Bill Metoyer said the recording studio, "had 2 rooms. One was dead and the room next to it was a totally live sounding room."

== Songs ==
Psalm 9's songs and lyrical content are primarily from the Bible; the title track contains verses directly from the King James Version. The name of the opening song, "The Tempter," comes from a line in Matthew 4:3. "The Fall of Lucifer" is primarily about the events of Revelation 12:7-9; the song makes mention of the lines "angel of light" from 2 Corinthians 11:14 and "the dragon," used in several verses in Revelation 12. "Revelation (Life or Death)" references the events of the Book of Revelation in both the title and lyrics. The track "Assassin" was released as a single in 1984 and included a cover of British rock band Cream's 1967 song "Tales of Brave Ulysses" as a B-side.

== Track listing ==
All tracks are written by Trouble except for "Tales of Brave Ulysses"; lyrics for the track "Psalm 9" arranged by Eric Wagner.

Side One
No.	Title	Length
1.	"The Tempter^{[a]}^{[b]}"	6:36
2.	"Assassin^{[a]}^{[b]}"	3:12
3.	"Victim of the Insane^{[a]}"	5:09
4.	"Revelation (Life or Death)^{[a]}^{[b]}"	5:04

Side Two
No.	Title	Lyrics	Length
5.	"Bastards Will Pay^{[a]}"		3:44
6.	"The Fall of Lucifer^{[c]}"		5:43
7.	"Endtime^{[a]}" (Instrumental)		4:56
8.	"Psalm 9^{[a]}"	arr. Eric Wagner	4:48
Total length:			39:15

CD reissue bonus track
No.	Title	Writer(s)	Length
9.	"Tales of Brave Ulysses^{[d]}" (Cream cover)	Eric Clapton; Martin Sharp	4:00
Total length:			43:15

^{a} Live recording previously appeared on Trouble Live (1983).
^{b} Early recording previously appeared on 1982 Demo.
^{c} Demo version previously recorded in 1981.
^{d} Song not included on the 1991 CD bundled with The Skull.

Bonus DVD

1. "Assassin" (video recording)
2. "Interview" (part 1)
3. "Psalm 9" (video recording)
4. "Interview" (part 2)
5. "Victim of the Insane" (video recording)

== Personnel ==
Trouble

- Eric Wagner – vocals
- Bruce Franklin – guitars
- Rick Wartell – guitars
- Sean McAllister – bass
- Jeff Olson – drums

Production

- Bill Metoyer – producer, engineer
- Brian Slagel – producer
- Trouble – producer
- Gary Docken – cover artwork
- Joe LaRosa – logo concept
- Mastered at JVC Cutting Center in Hollywood, California (original version)
- Erwin Hermsen – remastering at Toneshed Recording Studio in The Netherlands (2020 version)
