= Probot =

- The album's cover art was created by Voivod drummer Michel Langevin.

Studio album by Probot
- Released: February 10, 2004
- Recorded: 2000–2003
- Genres: Heavy metal, thrash metal, groove metal, crossover thrash, doom metal
- Length: 52:18
- Label: Southern Lord (SUNN30)

Singles from Probot
- 1. "Centuries of Sin" Released: November 2003; 2. "Shake Your Blood" Released: December 2003

Probot was a heavy metal recording project led by American musician Dave Grohl, as a side project from his primary group Foo Fighters. The album was released in February 2004.

Described by Grohl as "a death metal Supernatural", the album mixes instrumentals recorded mainly by Grohl along with various metal singers he admired.

The album featured two singles: "Centuries of Sin" backed with "The Emerald Law", and "Shake Your Blood". A music video was released for the latter. Critical reception was mixed to positive, and the album was a modest commercial success globally.

== Background ==
After years of popularity in the alternative rock scene, Dave Grohl wanted to express his longtime passion for heavy metal music. He mentioned the catalyst of the experience being during the first leg of the tour in support of the Foo Fighters album There Is Nothing Left to Lose (1999), with the mellower songs making him think about the heavier bands he used to listen to.

Following the tour, Grohl went to his house in Alexandria, Virginia, to record some heavier songs in Studio 606, his home recording facility, with engineer Adam Kasper. Grohl would play with his Gibson Explorer through a small Peavey amp as he watched TV with Kasper, and once he got a riff that interested him, he would bring Kasper along to the basement, recording a drum arrangement followed by bass and guitar. Each instrumental would take about 45 minutes to complete. Grohl said that he did not intend to make an album out of the recordings – "I didn’t even call them songs because they were bare instrumentals with no intention of putting vocals on them and no direction as an actual song." After four days of recording, Grohl and Kasper had done seven tracks, with Grohl making some copies out of the master tape before labeling it Probot to distinguish from the Foo Fighters' work.

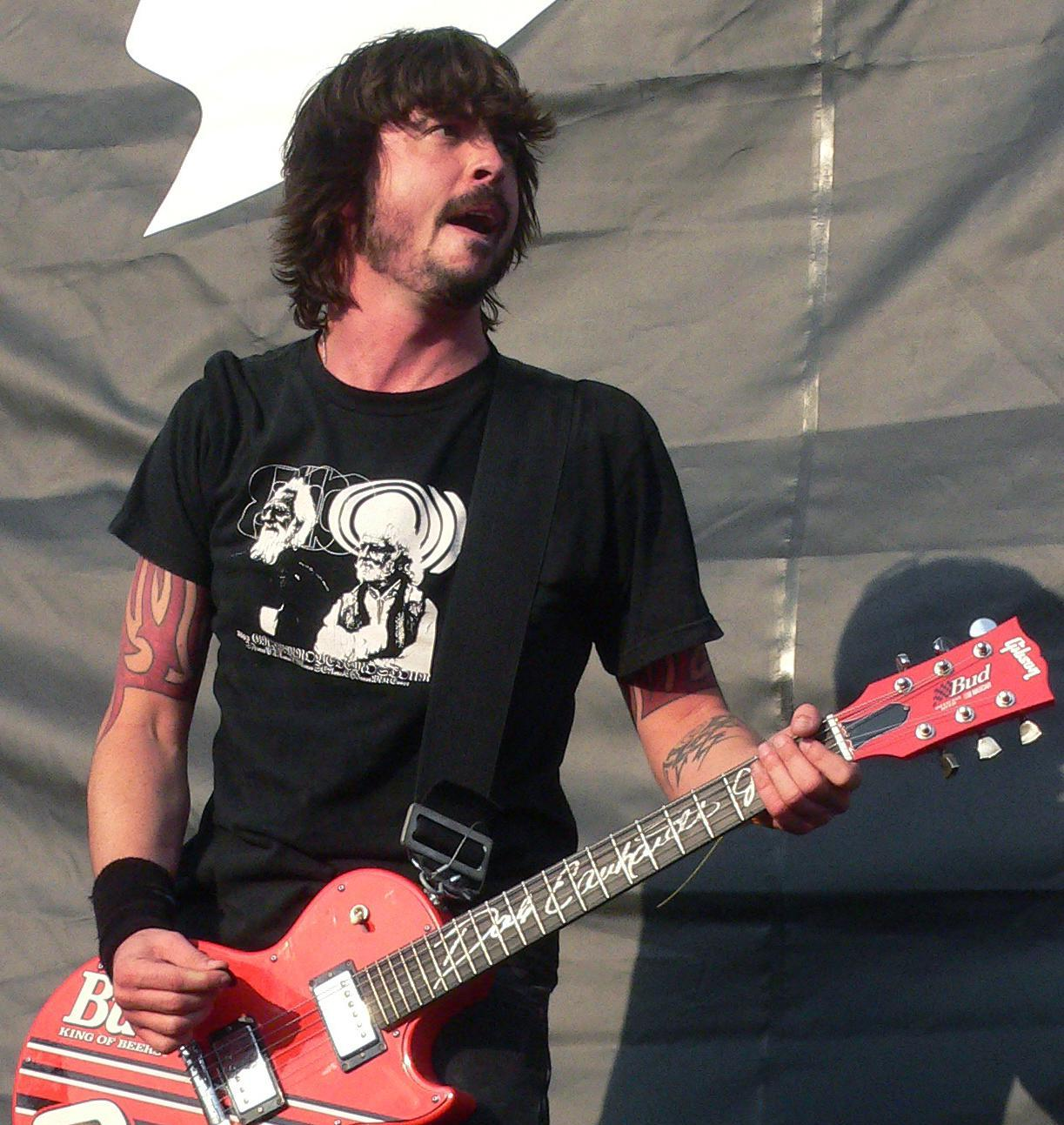
Dave Grohl played the majority of instruments on the album, including all of the drum tracks.

Some time later, Grohl was inspired by the Santana album Supernatural (1999), which featured veteran guitarist Carlos Santana collaborating with a variety of singers. Grohl decided to attempt collaborations with singers he had idolized. He came up with "my wish list of all of my favorite singers from this era which is '82 to '89 underground metal, and all the bands I listened to at the time: Eric Wagner from Trouble, Snake from Voivod, Cronos [from Venom], Lemmy and Wino," and started contacting the musicians, some of whom were reached by Grohl's friend Matt Sweeney given the Foo Fighters had restarted their tour. Grohl feared his fame built out of being "a stupid, middle-of-the-road, alternative-rock idiot" could drive the metal singers away, but many agreed immediately. Cronos would later explain that "I'm open for everything. And Dave's cool," detailing that Grohl's email opened with "a real fan letter" where he mentioned his longtime appreciation of Venom, and then explained about his idea of a metal album with all his metal heroes "to get something off his chest."

Seeing the positive response, Grohl brought Kasper and Sweeney back to do five more instrumental tracks and round out the project. According to Grohl, he was invited to write songs for Ozzy Osbourne's album Down to Earth (2001). When Grohl's songs were ultimately not used for Osbourne, he repurposed them for Probot where they were sung by Eric Wagner and King Diamond. Sweeney would organize the project as Grohl toured with the Foo Fighters, contacting vocalists and organizing recording sessions. Then the demo tapes were sent to the singers, each of whom was asked to come up with lyrics, record them and title the song. Cronos detailed he wrote three different versions of the song so Grohl could choose one.

== Production and style ==
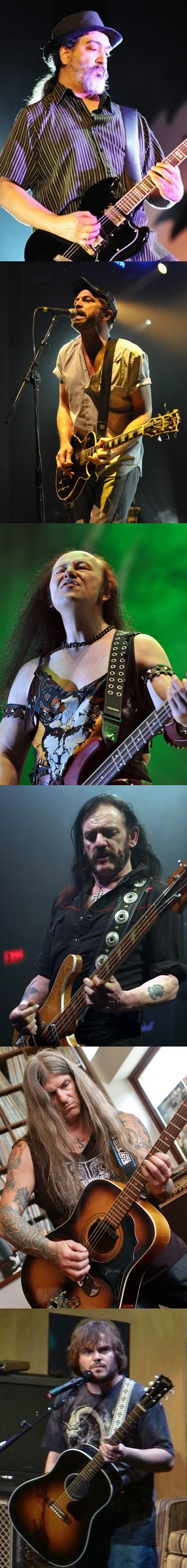
From top to bottom: Kim Thayil and Matt Sweeney played additional guitar parts on the album. Cronos and Lemmy played bass guitar on the songs they sang, while Wino and Jack Black played guitar on the tracks on which they sang.

On the album, Grohl teamed up with heavy metal vocalists from 1980s and 1990s bands who influenced his musical tastes while he was growing up. Similar to 1995's Foo Fighters, Grohl wrote all of the music and performed most of the instrumentation. Each track on the album features a different lead singer including Lemmy, Max Cavalera, King Diamond and Tom Warrior. Grohl described the sequencing as "like a compilation tape that I would have made as a kid."

Only Lemmy and Wino visited Studio 606 to record, with all the others sending tapes from studio to studio until the album was finished. Soundgarden guitarist Kim Thayil plays additional guitar on two tracks thanks to Kasper, who had brought the Probot tapes to Seattle and they attracted Thayil's interest. Grohl was pleased with the addition as Thayil had more experience with lead guitars, while Grohl was "more about the riff and the rhythm". A bonus track titled "I Am The Warlock" was provided by comedian/actor/musician Jack Black. According to Black, who described the song as "a homage to 'Iron Man.'" after Grohl approached him regarding writing lyrics, Black's wife Tanya Haden suggested "it should be about a fucked up relationship," so Black made it about a warlock.

Grohl also approached death metal legend Chuck Schuldiner of Death to contribute to Probot. However, Schuldiner was struggling with brain cancer and was unable to be involved despite the efforts of Grohl and others to raise funds for his medical treatment. Grohl also attempted to get Slayer's lead singer Tom Araya on the album, but scheduling conflicts prevented collaboration. Grohl subsequently invited Kurt Brecht from D.R.I. Grohl mentioned he and Sweeney had discussed and considered a lot of different singers, including the retired Jeff Becerra of Possessed, Chuck Billy from Testament, Pantera's Phil Anselmo, and the vocalists from Kreator, Destruction, Hirax and Candlemass. Sweeney vetoed Unleashed's Johnny Hedlund, who at the time was rumored to be a Nazi sympathizer.

In a 2007 interview for Guitar World magazine, Grohl was asked about the future of Probot. He explained that the idea behind Probot had been successfully realized and he doubted it would continue in any form.

== Release ==
Despite Grohl's label Roswell having a deal with RCA Records, he knew such an unorthodox project featuring cult musicians of the metal scene would not be easily accepted by major labels. RCA was interested at first, but later Grohl decided to follow the spirit of the original bands "on independent, punk-rock do it yourself labels." Grohl's friend Pete Stahl suggested Southern Lord Records, which was founded by Greg Anderson.

The album is available as a single CD and a double LP (available on red and black vinyl). Southern Lord released a double A-sided single, "Centuries of Sin/The Emerald Law" in a limited edition of 6,666 on 7" vinyl only. It is available on black, green, red & red/black swirl vinyl, and sold out shortly after release. The album artwork was created by musician Away (Michel Langevin) of Voivod.

== Reception ==
Professional ratings
Review scores
Source	Rating
Allmusic	4/5 stars
Blender	4/5 stars
Entertainment Weekly	B−
Pitchfork Media	7.0/10
PopMatters	favorable
Rolling Stone	3.5/5 stars
Spin	3.5/5 stars
Stylus Magazine	A

Critical reception to the Probot album was largely positive with few recurring complaints; Metacritic shows a 72/100 critic rating based on 21 reviews. Rolling Stone declared it as "the year's first great metal album," while Blender reported, "Unlike similar records... this has a unity of aesthetic purpose, a competitive wallop, even (kind of) a seriousness."

David Browne of Entertainment Weekly gave Probot a B− rating. He notes, "For a lark, it aims for (and hits) a few bull's-eyes, including the whiplashing 'The Emerald Law' and the post-apocalyptic death march 'Ice Cold Man'." However, Browne comments how the mystery and thrill of vintage metal bands is "largely gone" with many lyrics on Probot sounding "more amusing than menacing" and even "unintentionally funny." He sums it up as "lying somewhere between homage and howler."

Probot earned an A rating in Stylus magazine as well as the title of StylusMagazine.com's Album of the Week for February 8–14, 2004. Scott McKeating's extensive review describes how "Probot balances the grit with the sonic polish without lapsing into Metallica's Metallica. This is metal that demands banging, shaking and stamping." He commends the ambition of its overall conception, noting, "Very few [artists] go as far as Grohl and actually create something vital and new in their mid-thirties from their teenage obsessions. . . Probot is an inspirational record in every sense."

Adrien Begrand of PopMatters describes it as "One of the coolest ideas for an album in a long time, Grohl has put together a record that not only serves as a sincere tribute to the metal and hardcore bands of his youth, but features all his favorite vocalists as well." He gave a favorable review but heavily discussed Grohl's guitar skills and songwriting as lacking: "The biggest problem on the album is Grohl's complete lack of inventiveness as a guitar player. . . Had Dave Grohl used more guest musicians instead of trying to do everything himself, Probot would have been much better." Despite these criticisms, Begrand considers it "impossible not to like this album, mistakes and all."

Awarding a 4/5 rating, Allmusic's Alex Henderson emphasizes the wide variety of genres featured on Probot and adds, "Whatever the style of metal that he is embracing, Grohl's drumming is passionate throughout this fine album, which is as rewarding as it is unpredictable."

== "Shake Your Blood" ==
Although Grohl recorded the guitar and drums himself, Lemmy performed his own bass and wrote the lyrics to "Shake Your Blood". He noted, "I wrote the lyrics in about ten minutes. . . It's rock & roll, you know. It's not one of those complicated things." The song bears strong resemblance to Lemmy's style and was considered "a terrific Motörhead clone" by Adrien Begrand of PopMatters.

The "Shake Your Blood" music video was filmed in November 2003 and released shortly thereafter. It features an appearance by 66 women from the SuicideGirls adult entertainment website. The music video also appears on the extras section on the movie SuicideGirls: The First Tour. In the video, the band is represented with Dave Grohl on drums, Lemmy on lead vocals and bass, and Wino (who sang on the Probot track "The Emerald Law") on lead guitar. Lemmy regarded the performance as "just like a tour in the '60s, when things were a lot more fun."

== Live performances ==
Foo Fighters performed "Shake Your Blood" live with Lemmy at their 2006 Hyde Park (UK) show, and on June 18, 2011, at Foo Fighters concert in Berlin. "My Tortured Soul" was performed live on Headbangers' Ball in 2004, with Eric Wagner on lead vocals, Grohl on drums, Wino on lead guitar, Greg Anderson (of Goatsnake and Sunn O)))) on rhythm guitar, and Foo Fighters producer Nick Raskulinecz on bass guitar. This performance is available on the compilation album MTV2 Headbangers Ball, Vol. 2. Soulfly has also been known to play "Red War" live as recently as 2009. "Ice Cold Man" has also been played by Cathedral on their 2004 tour. "Centuries of Sin" has also been played by Venom on their 2009 tour in South America.

== Track listing ==
All music is composed by Dave Grohl.

No.	Title	Lyrics and Vocals	Length
1.	"Centuries of Sin" (feat. Cronos of Venom)	Cronos	4:10
2.	"Red War" (feat. Max Cavalera of Sepultura and Soulfly)	Cavalera	3:30
3.	"Shake Your Blood" (feat. Lemmy of Motörhead)	Lemmy	3:00
4.	"Access Babylon" (feat. Mike Dean of Corrosion of Conformity)	Dean	1:24
5.	"Silent Spring" (feat. Kurt Brecht of Dirty Rotten Imbeciles)	Brecht	3:28
6.	"Ice Cold Man" (feat. Lee Dorrian of Cathedral and Napalm Death, and Kim Thayil of Soundgarden)	Dorrian	5:53
7.	"The Emerald Law" (feat. Wino of Saint Vitus and The Obsessed)	Wino	5:33
8.	"Big Sky" (feat. Tom G. Warrior of Celtic Frost)	Tom G. Warrior	4:51
9.	"Dictatosaurus" (feat. Snake of Voivod)	Snake	3:52
10.	"My Tortured Soul" (feat. Eric Wagner of Trouble)	Wagner	5:00
11.	"Sweet Dreams" (feat. King Diamond of King Diamond and Mercyful Fate, and Kim Thayil of Soundgarden; the song "Sweet Dreams" ends at minute 5:26. After 3 minutes and 30 seconds of silence, at minute 8:56 begins the hidden song "I Am the Warlock", featuring Jack Black of Tenacious D)	King Diamond	12:06

== Personnel ==
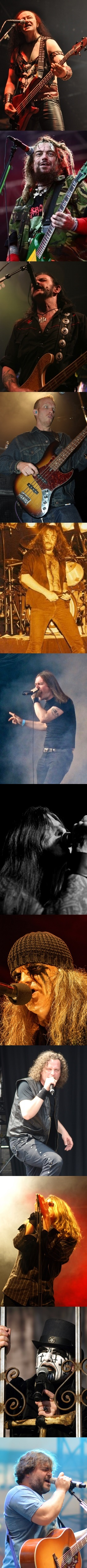
The singers featured on Probot are, from top to bottom: Cronos, Max Cavalera, Lemmy, Mike Dean, Kurt Brecht, Lee Dorrian, Wino, Tom G. Warrior, Snake, Eric Wagner, King Diamond, and Jack Black.
- Dave Grohl – all instruments except where noted
- Kim Thayil – additional guitar (tracks 6, 11)
- Cronos – lead vocals, bass (track 1)
- Max Cavalera – lead vocals (track 2)
- Lemmy – lead vocals, bass (track 3)
- Mike Dean – lead vocals (track 4)
- Kurt Brecht – lead vocals (track 5)
- Lee Dorrian – lead vocals (track 6)
- Scott "Wino" Weinrich – lead vocals, lead guitar (track 7)
- Tom G. Warrior – lead vocals (track 8)
- Denis "Snake" Bélanger – lead vocals (track 9)
- Eric Wagner – lead vocals (track 10)
- King Diamond – lead vocals (track 11)
- Jack Black – lead vocals, guitar (hidden track)
- Bubba Dupree (Void) – guitar (track 4)
- Erol Unala (Apollyon Sun, Celtic Frost) – guitar (track 8)
- Matt Sweeney – additional guitar (track 9)
- Stephen O'Malley – Design
- Michel "Away" Langevin – Cover Art

== Charts ==
=== Album charts ===
Chart (2004)	Peak position
Australian Albums (ARIA)	34
Belgian Albums (Ultratop Flanders)	59
Dutch Albums (Album Top 100)	77
Finnish Albums (Suomen virallinen lista)	32
German Albums (Offizielle Top 100)	36
New Zealand Albums (RMNZ)	43
Norwegian Albums (VG-lista)	12
UK Albums (Official Charts)	34
US Billboard 200	68

=== Singles charts ===
Year	Single	Peak positions
Year	Single	UK
2004	"Centuries of Sin"	91
