= Manic Frustration =

Studio album by Trouble
- Released: June 16, 1992
- Recorded: 1991
- Studios: Indigo Ranch Studios (Malibu, California), Studio II (Culver City, California), and Hollywood Sound Recorders (Los Angeles, California)
- Genres: Heavy metal, psychedelic rock, stoner rock
- Length: 43:12
- Label: Def American
- Producers: Rick Rubin and Trouble

Trouble chronology
Trouble (1990)	Manic Frustration (1992)	Plastic Green Head (1995)

Professional ratings
Review scores
Source	Rating
AllMusic	4.5/5 stars
Collector's Guide to Heavy Metal	10/10
Kerrang!	5/5 stars
Rock Hard	9.0/10

Manic Frustration is the fifth studio album by American doom metal band Trouble, released on June 16, 1992. It was the band's last release via the label Def American. A promotional disc was released with the songs "'Scuse Me," "The Sleeper," and "Memory's Garden" in 1992, the last song of which also had a music video. The album was reissued and remastered by Hammerheart Records in 2020.

== Track listing ==
All tracks are written by Eric Wagner, Bruce Franklin and Rick Wartell, except "Breathe..." by Donovan Leitch, which is a partial cover of his song Atlantis.

No.	Title	Writer(s)	Length
1.	"Come Touch the Sky"		2:53
2.	"'Scuse Me"		3:24
3.	"The Sleeper"		3:14
4.	"Fear"		3:37
5.	"Rain"		4:16
6.	"Tragedy Man"		4:16
7.	"Memory's Garden"		4:23
8.	"Manic Frustration"		4:10
9.	"Hello Strawberry Skies"		3:03
10.	"Mr. White"		3:25
11.	"Breathe..."	Donovan Leitch	6:31
Total length:			43:12

== Personnel ==
Trouble

- Eric Wagner – vocals
- Bruce Franklin – guitars
- Rick Wartell – guitars
- Ron Holzner – bass
- Barry Stern – drums

Additional musicians

- Rick Seratte – keyboards
- Ron Anderson, Gary Hoey – vocal guidance & inspiration

Production

- Rick Rubin – producer with Trouble
- Chris Kupper, Brendan O'Brien – engineers
- Dave Sardy – mixing at Hollywood Sound, Los Angeles
- Howie Weinberg – mastering at Masterdisk, New York
- Kim Champagne – art direction
- Trouble – front cover concept
- Jean-Francois Podevin – front cover illustration
- Chris Cuffaro – individual photos
