= Barry Stern =

American drummer

- Born: January 24, 1960
- Died: April 1, 2005 (age 45)
- Genres: Heavy metal, doom metal
- Occupation: Musician
- Instrument: Drums
- Years active: 1976-2005

Barry Stern (January 24, 1960 – April 1, 2005) was a heavy metal drummer from Chicago, Illinois.

== History ==
=== Zoetrope and Trouble (1976–1995) ===
From 1976 until 1988, he drummed for Zoetrope, for whom he also served as vocalist and songwriter. After recording two albums with that band, Stern joined Trouble in 1989. He appeared on two of their albums, 1990's Trouble and 1992's Manic Frustration, before leaving in 1993. In 1994, Barry replaced Joe Hasselvander in Cathedral for touring purposes.

=== Final musical projects and death (2005–2007) ===
A guest spot on Debris Inc.'s 2005 self-titled debut album was Barry's final recording appearance.

Stern died on April 1, 2005, from complications following hip replacement surgery. He was the son of Louise Stern, the brother of Karen Stern Jarger and Arlen Stern, the brother in-law of John Jarger, as well as the uncle of Jeremy Jaeger, Lindsay Jarger, and Alan Stern.

Prior to his death, he was the founder of the band D-Connect (his stage name). Stern was singing and drumming for the band D-Connect at the time of his death. Trouble dedicated their 2007 album Simple Mind Condition to his memory.

== Bands ==
Former

- Zoetrope - Drums (1976–1988)
- Trouble - Drums (1989–1993)
- D-Connect - Drums, Vocals (2003–2005)

Live

- Cathedral - Drums (1994–1995)

== Discography ==
Zoetrope

- "The Right Way" b/w "Call 33" 7" (1980, self-released)
- The Metal Log Vol. 1 demo tape (1983, self-released)
- The Metal Log Vol. 2 demo tape (1985, self-released)
- Amnesty LP (1985, Combat Records, reissued on CD with the Metal Log demos as bonus tracks by Century Media in Europe in 1999)
- A Life of Crime LP (1987, Combat Records, reissued on CD with liner notes by Kevin Michael on Century Media in Europe in 1998)

Trouble

- Trouble (1990)
- Trouble Live Dallas Bootleg (1990, a live concert originally broadcast by radio during the band's tour for the self-titled album on Def American, available on CDR through the band's website)
- Manic Frustration (1992)
- Knocking on Heavy's Door (1992; Split w/ Massacria, Tanner, Meglomanic)

Debris Inc.

- Debris Inc. (2005)
