= Retro Grave =

Retro Grave is an American hard rock band formed in 2006 by Jeff Olson, original drummer for doom metal band Trouble.

In 2006, Olson formed Retro Grave while still the drummer for Trouble. The band's debut self-titled EP was released on June 5, 2007, and was written, recorded, and performed entirely by Olson alongside lyricist Paull Goodchild. The band's debut full-length album, Again, was released on February 9, 2010, with guest musicians.

Olson has been collaborating with various musicians for the band's second album, titled Skullduggery.

== Members ==
=== Current members ===
- Jeff Olson – drums, vocals, keyboards, brass, strings
- J. Cortes – bass, backing vocals
- Michael Leonard Maiewski – guitar

=== Former members ===
- Michael Schermuly – guitar (2008–2009)

== Discography ==
=== Studio albums ===
- Again (2010)

=== EPs ===
- Retro Grave (2007)
