= Track Record Studios =

Coordinates: 34.09094°N 118.32601°W

- Founded: c. 1970
- Genre: Various
- Country of origin: United States
- Location: North Hollywood, California
- Official website: paramountrecording.com/track-record-north/

Track Record Studios is a recording studio, originally established around 1970 and located in North Hollywood, California.

Many gold or platinum records were recorded or mixed at Track Record: The Offspring's Ignition and the follow-up Smash (which has gone platinum six times), Emmylou Harris' Roses in the Snow, Megadeth's Peace Sells... but Who's Buying?, Red Hot Chili Peppers' Mother's Milk, Jane's Addiction's Ritual de lo Habitual, Social Distortion's self-titled third album, Blink-182's Dude Ranch, Wu-Tang Clan's The W, Aerosmith's Nine Lives, Evanescence's Fallen, Aaliyah's One in a Million, Goo Goo Dolls' Dizzy Up the Girl, Maroon 5's Songs About Jane, Tori Amos' Little Earthquakes, Kiss' Revenge and Quincy Jones' Q's Jook Joint.

Snoop Dogg recorded his first two albums, Doggystyle and Tha Doggfather, at Track Record as did Tupac Shakur for the sessions of two of his posthumous releases R U Still Down? (Remember Me) and Still I Rise, the collaboration with Outlawz. Other clients that have recorded or mixed at the studio include Slayer, Corrosion of Conformity, Trouble, Bad Religion, Agent Orange, Face to Face, Fates Warning, The Bouncing Souls, Ignite, SNFU, Sacred Reich, School of Fish, Tuff, Cypress Hill, Dr. Dre, Ice Cube, LL Cool J, Run–D.M.C., System of a Down, Iggy Pop, Mötley Crüe, Limp Bizkit, Chicago, Scorpions, Foreigner, 7 Seconds, Mary J. Blige, Jessica Simpson, Avenged Sevenfold, John Fogerty, Courtney Love, Kid Rock, Pat Benatar, White Zombie, Brandy, Tito Puente, Coolio, Black Label Society, Dwight Yoakam, Pink and Dishwalla. Studio was purchased by Paramount Recording Studios in 2010.
