= Zoroaster (band) =

American sludge metal band

- Origin: Atlanta, Georgia, U.S.
- Genres: Sludge metal; doom metal; southern metal
- Years active: 2003–2013
- Labels: E1 Entertainment; Battle Kommand; Kreation; Terminal Doom; Steamhammer
- Past members: Mike Morris; Dan Scanlan; Will Fiore; Rod Fiore; Brent Anderson

Zoroaster is an American sludge metal band from Atlanta, Georgia that formed in 2003 and was active until around 2013.

== History ==
The original line-up included bassist Brent Anderson, guitarist Will Fiore, and drummer Todd Fiore, all of whom were previously members of Terminal Doom Explosion. The band released four studio albums: Zoroaster in 2005, Dog Magic in 2007, Voice of Saturn in 2009, and Matador in 2010. They were signed to E1 Entertainment.

== Discography ==
Studio albums

- Zoroaster (2005, Battle Kommand / Kreation)
- Dog Magic (2007, Battle Kommand / Kreation)
- Voice of Saturn (2009, Terminal Doom / Kreation)
- Matador (2010, E1 Entertainment / Steamhammer)

Live albums

- Live at Star Bar Atlanta (2006, Terminal Doom)
- Live at Smith's Olde Bar DVD (2008, Terminal Doom)

Split releases

- Terminal Doom Records Vol 1 with Music Hates You and Christine (2008, Terminal Doom)
- Aldebaran / Zoroaster with Aldebaran (2009, Kreation)

Other appearances

- "Witch Hammer" on Metal Swim (2010, Williams Street)
