= Witch Mountain (band) =

American doom metal band

- Origin: Portland, Oregon, U.S.
- Genres: Doom metal; occult rock
- Years active: 1997–present
- Labels: Profound Lore, Mountastic
- Members: Nathan Carson; Justin Brown; Rob Wrong; Kayla Dixon
- Past members: Charles Thomas; Neal Munson; Uta Plotkin; Dave Hoopaugh; Johnny Belluzzi; Kip Larson; Rob Keith; Anthony Hubik; Preston Reyes

Witch Mountain is an American doom metal band from Portland, Oregon.

Formed in 1997, Witch Mountain recorded a demo, released their first full-length album, and toured both nationally and locally. After a 2002 tour with Eternal Elysium, the band slowed activity while Rob and Dave attended to their respective families and their other band Iommi Stubbs, and Nate worked on other musical collaborations and his booking agency, Nanotear. After a July 2009 show opening for Pentagram, guest singer Uta was asked to join the band as main vocalist, marking a revival of the band. Witch Mountain's second full-length album, South of Salem, was recorded six months later at Smegma Studios, produced by Billy Anderson, and released in April 2011, coinciding with a SXSW tour.

In November 2011, Witch Mountain was signed with Profound Lore. As of their February 17, 2012 South of Salem CD release show, Dave parted with the band to concentrate on family and other projects, leaving bass duties to Billions and Billions member Neal Munson. Witch Mountain released their third full-length album, Cauldron of the Wild, on June 12, 2012.

Neal Munson left the band in July 2013. New member Charles Thomas joined Witch Mountain to continue bass duties.

Uta Plotkin left the band after the release of Mobile of Angels, in September 2014. Kayla Dixon is now the main vocalist.

== Band members ==
=== Current line-up ===
- Nate Carson – drums (1997–present)
- Justin Brown – bass (2015–present)
- Rob Wrong – guitar, vocals (1997–present)
- Kayla Dixon – vocals (2015–present)

=== Past members ===
- Charles Thomas – bass (2013–2014)
- Uta Plotkin – vocals (2009–2014)
- Neal Munson – bass (2012–2013)
- Dave Hoopaugh – bass (2000–2012)
- Johnny Belluzzi – rhythm guitar (2000–2002)
- Kip Larson – bass (1999–2000)
- Rob Keith – bass (1998–1999)
- Anthony Hubik – bass (1997–1998)
- Preston Reyes – bass (1997)

== Discography ==
- Homegrown Doom (demo, 1999)
- ...Come the Mountain (2001)
- Metal Swim (Adult Swim compilation, 2010)
- South of Salem (LP 2011, CD 2012)
- Let It Rain (Oregon Historical Society compilation, 2012)
- Witch Mountain EP (2012)
- Cauldron of the Wild (2012)
- Mobile of Angels (2014)
- Burn You Down b/w Hare's Stare (single 2016)
- Witch Mountain (2018)
