= Metal Swim =

Compilation album by various artists
- Released: September 20, 2010
- Genre: Sludge metal, stoner metal, doom metal, heavy metal
- Length: 82:06
- Label: Williams Street

Adult Swim Music chronology
Adult Swim Singles Program 2010 (2010)	Metal Swim (2010)	Adult Swim Singles Program 2011 (2011)

Metal Swim is a heavy metal compilation album released by Adult Swim as a free download on their website. It consists of rare and unreleased material from various metal bands.

== Track listing ==
1. Death Angel – "Truce" (3:30)
2. Skeletonwitch – "Bringers of Death" (2:55)
3. Torche – "Arrowhead" (2:17)
4. Ludicra – "Path of Ash" (9:20)
5. Kylesa – "Forsaken" (3:41)
6. Black Tusk – "Fatal Kiss" (3:53)
7. Red Fang – "Hank Is Dead" (2:34)
8. Black Cobra – "Frozen Night" (4:57)
9. Saviours – "Dixie Dieway" (5:48)
10. Witch Mountain – "Veil of the Forgotten" (5:09)
11. Isis – "Pliable Foe" (7:43)
12. Jesu – "Dethroned" (7:10)
13. Pelican – "Inch Above Sand" (3:32)
14. Zoroaster – "Witch's Hammer" (4:11)
15. Withered – "Extinguished with the Weary" (5:27)
16. Boris – "Luna" (9:59)
