= Trouble (Trouble album) =

Studio album by Trouble
- Released: February 13, 1990
- Recorded: 1989
- Genre: Doom metal; heavy metal
- Length: 42:13
- Label: Def American, Hammerheart
- Producer: Rick Rubin

Trouble chronology
Run to the Light (1987)	Trouble (1990)	Manic Frustration (1992)

Professional ratings
Review scores
Source	Rating
AllMusic	4.5/5 stars
Cross Rhythms	6/10 stars
Collector's Guide to Heavy Metal	10/10
Rock Hard	9.0/10

Trouble is the fourth studio album by American doom metal band Trouble, released on Def American on February 13, 1990. It was the first Trouble album to have Barry Stern on drums. Music videos were made for "At the End of My Daze," "Psychotic Reaction," "R.I.P.," and "The Misery Shows (Act II);" the music videos were released on the Videos DVD by the band's Trouble, Inc. label in 2007. The album was reissued and remastered by Hammerheart Records, cooperating alongside Trouble, Inc., on November 27, 2020.

== Track listing ==
All tracks are written by Eric Wagner, Bruce Franklin, and Rick Wartell.

Side One
No.	Title	Length
1.	"At the End of My Daze"	3:11
2.	"The Wolf"	4:33
3.	"Psychotic Reaction"	3:14
4.	"A Sinner's Fame"	4:17
5.	"The Misery Shows (Act II)"	7:19

Side Two
No.	Title	Length
6.	"R.I.P. (Rest In Peace)"	4:08
7.	"Black Shapes of Doom"	3:46
8.	"Heaven on My Mind"	4:08
9.	"E.N.D. (Eternal Narcotic Depression)"	2:23
10.	"All is Forgiven"	5:11
Total length:		42:13

== Personnel ==
Trouble

- Eric Wagner – vocals
- Bruce Franklin – guitars
- Rick Wartell – guitars
- Ron Holzner – bass
- Barry Stern – drums

Additional musicians

- Jeff Olson – keyboards

Production

- Rick Rubin – producer
- David Bianco, Jimmy Heyson – engineers
- Brian Jenkins – assistant engineer
- Maria DeGrassi – art direction, design
- Paul Natkin – front cover photography
- David Skernick – back cover photography
- Timothy Eames – logo sculpture
- Adam Dubin – music videos director for "At the End of My Daze" and "R.I.P."
- Danny Cornyetz – music videos editor
- Dave Kaplan – manager
- Greg Fulginiti – mastering at Artisan Sound Recorders in Los Angeles, California (original version)
- Erwin Hermsen – remastering at Toneshed Recording Studio in The Netherlands (2020 version)
