= Trouble (band) =

American doom metal band

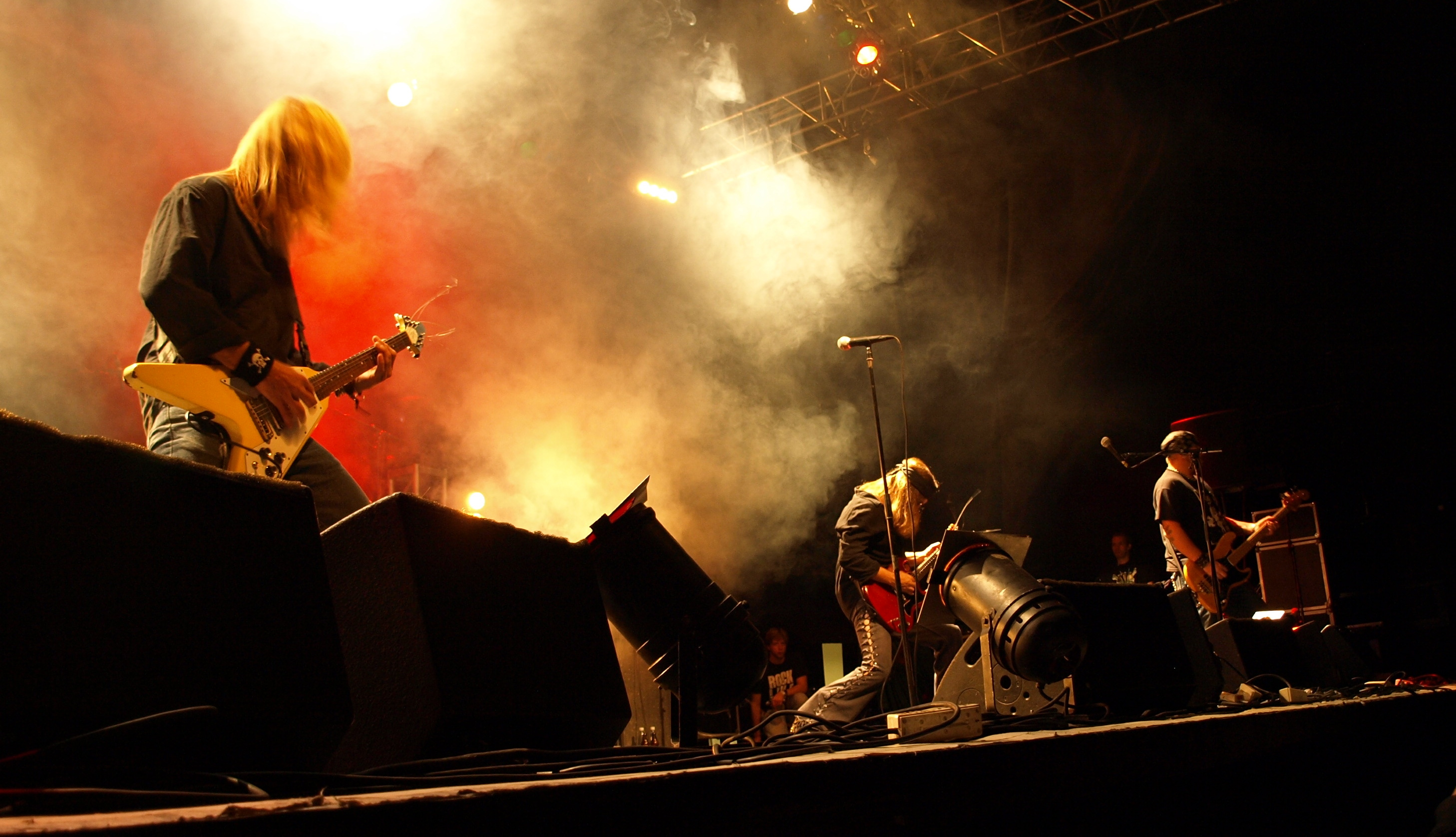
- Trouble at Jalometalli 2008

Background information
- Origin: Chicago, Illinois, U.S.
- Genres: Doom metal; Christian metal (early)
- Years active: 1978–present
- Labels: Metal Blade; Def American; Century Media; Escapi Music; Hammerheart
- Spinoffs: The Skull
- Members: Rick Wartell; Bruce Franklin; Kyle Thomas; Rob Hultz; Garry Naples
- Past members: Eric Wagner; Jeff Olson; Kory Clarke; Sean McAllister; Dennis Lesh; Ron Holzner; Barry Stern; Ted Kirkpatrick; Ian Brown; Chuck Robinson; Shane Pasqualla; Mark Lira

Trouble is an American doom metal band from Chicago, Illinois, formed in 1978. They are often considered one of the pioneers of doom metal, and have been referred to as one of the genre's "big four" alongside Candlemass, Pentagram and Saint Vitus. The band created a distinct style, taking influences of the British heavy metal bands Black Sabbath and Judas Priest, and psychedelic rock of the 1960s.

Trouble's first two albums, Psalm 9 and The Skull, are cited as landmarks of doom metal. To date, they have released eight studio albums. Although never officially disbanded, they went inactive after original singer Eric Wagner left in 1997. He rejoined in 2000 and left again eight years later; he was first replaced by Kory Clarke and then by current vocalist Kyle Thomas, who had also filled in for Wagner during his initial absence from Trouble. Eric Wagner died in 2021.

Core members include Wagner, guitarists Rick Wartell and Bruce Franklin, and drummer Jeff Olson. Early lyrics had a spiritual nature; Metal Blade Records initially marketed Trouble as "white metal" (in contrast to the rising black metal movement) in the 1980s.

== History ==
=== Formation and Metal Blade years (1978–1988) ===
Rick Wartell formed Trouble in 1978 during his high school years, as the sole guitarist and singer for the band, joined by bassist Mike DiPrima and drummer Mike Slopecki. Trouble played their first show that year at Gordon Technical Institute in Chicago. After placing an ad in the Illinois Entertainer in 1981, Wartell revamped the line-up to include guitarist Bruce Franklin, vocalist Eric Wagner, bassist Tim Ian Brown (not to be confused with lead singer of English band The Stone Roses), and drummer Jeff Olson. Ian Brown was replaced by Sean McAllister in 1983. Drawing from Black Sabbath for inspiration (with occasional nods to the psychedelic sounds of the late 1960s), the band used gloomy down-tuned riffs and spiritual, often openly Bible-inspired lyrics, which led Metal Blade to market the band as "white metal" as opposed to black metal. "I was brought up Catholic", vocalist and primary lyric writer Wagner explains in the liner notes of Psalm 9 re-issue (2006), "but you have to remember, back in the early 1980s, all the metal was kind of satanic, and I did not get into that vibe." Wagner has implied that Metal Blade came up with the term in the first place, which the band rejected: "I think it was more like Metal Blade trying to be cute or something, with everything [satanic metal] being called black metal, why not call us white metal, which is a bunch of crap."

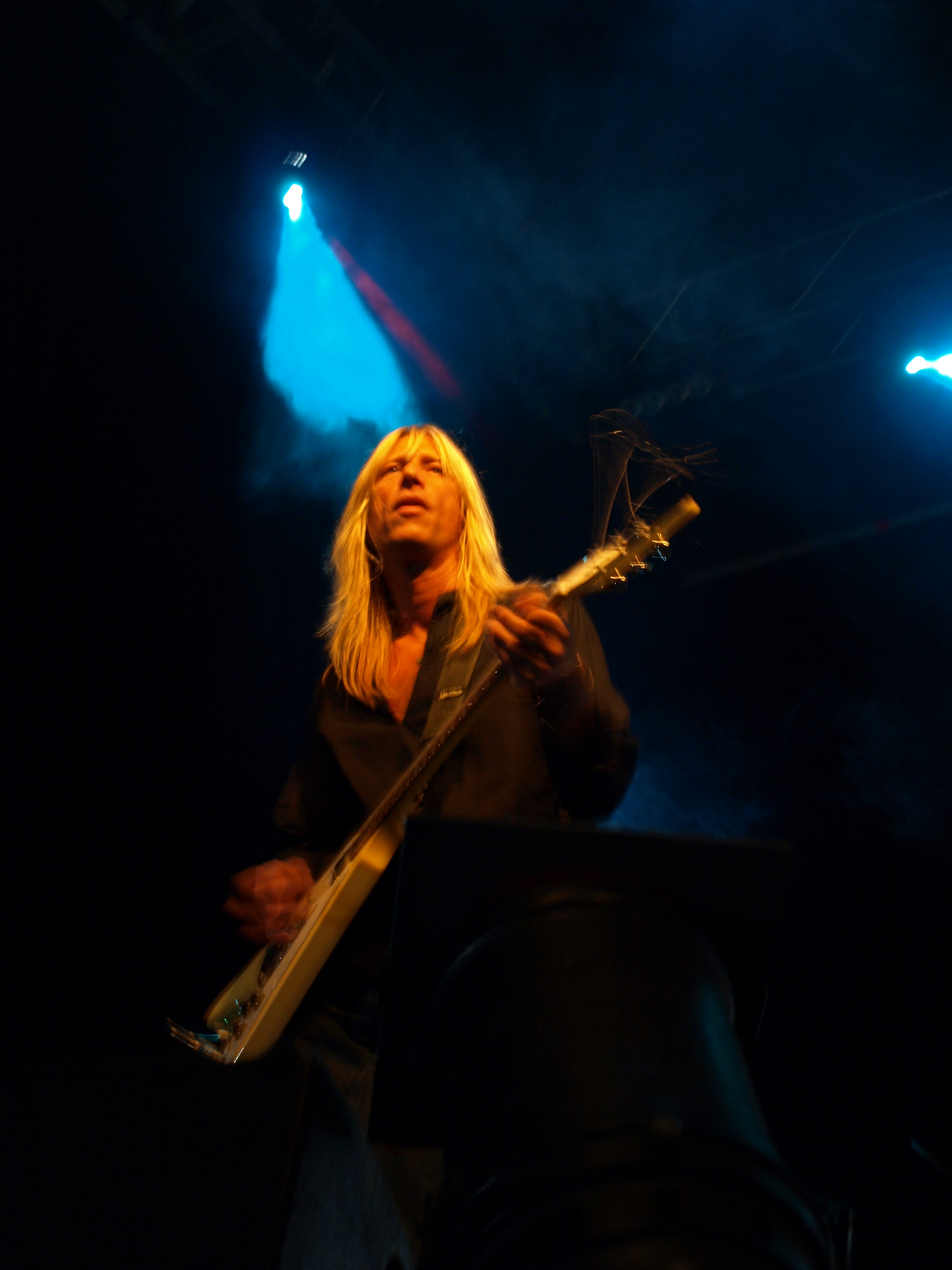
Rick Wartell live at Jalometalli 2008

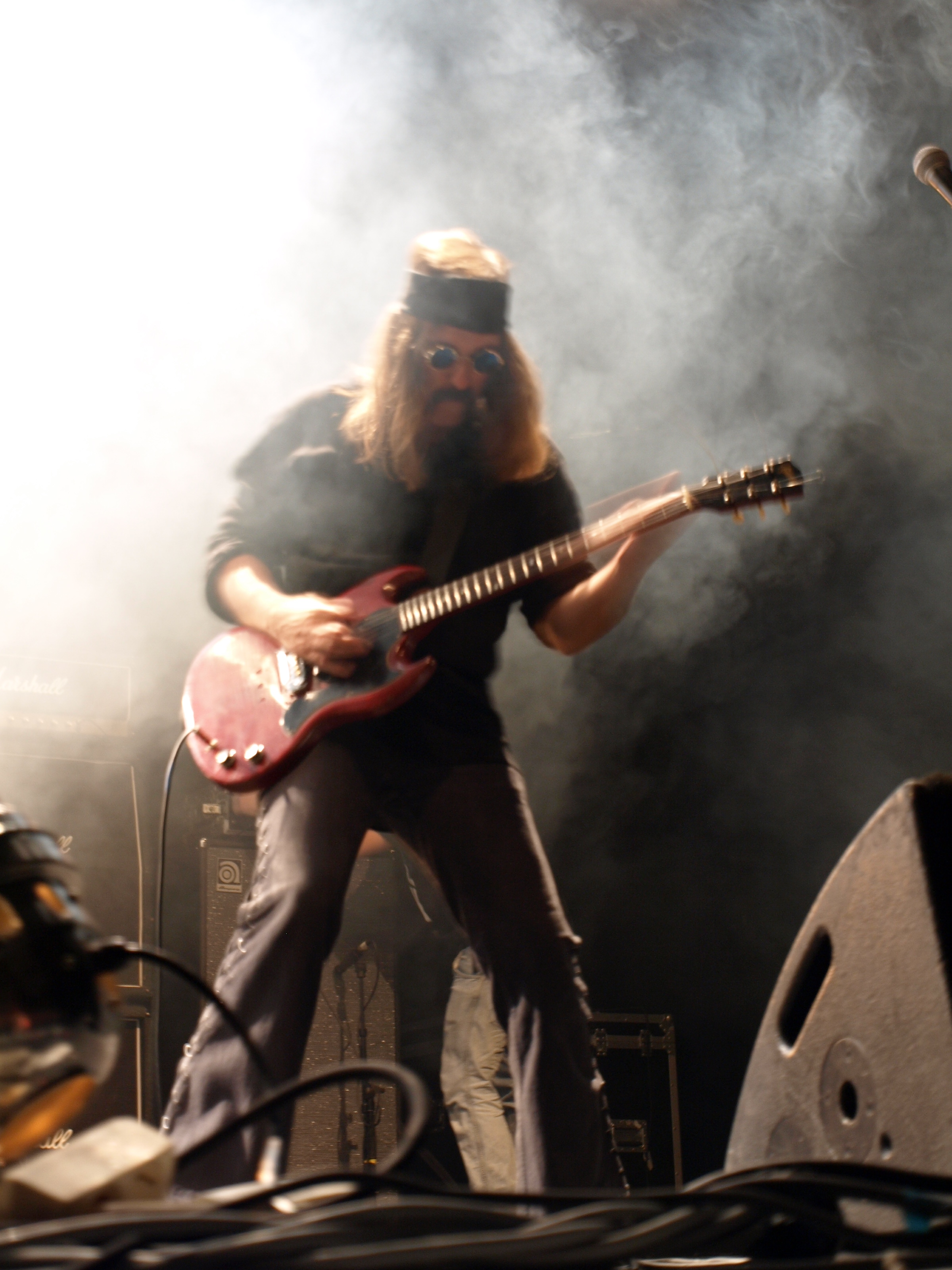
Bruce Franklin at Jalometalli 2008

The band toured throughout the Midwest during the early 1980s. On February 5, 1983, the band recorded Trouble Live in Chicago. Drummer Jeff Olson mailed the cassette to Brian Slagel of Metal Blade Records and the band landed their first record deal. Trouble released their eponymous debut (later referred to as Psalm 9) with Metal Blade Records in 1984. The Skull followed in 1985, and reflected singer Wagner's struggles with substance abuse, as well as growing turmoil within the group. This led to the replacement of bassist McAllister with Ron Holzner. Drummer Jeff Olson also departed. Reports suggested that Olson had left the band to become a preacher, but he had actually decided to pursue studies at Berklee College of Music in Boston, where he received his Bachelor of Music degree cum laude in Film Scoring. Dennis Lesh was drafted as his replacement for 1987's Run to the Light. In comparison to earlier recordings, the critics thought Run to the Light was "disappointing". Dennis Lesh played drums during Trouble's Run to the Light 1987 tour. Kirkpatrick later formed the Christian metal band Tourniquet in 1990.

=== Rise to popularity and hiatus (1989–1996) ===
A three-year hiatus occurred before the band was snapped up by Rick Rubin's Def American Records, for whom they recorded a second self-titled album (Trouble) in 1990 with Rubin producing. More experimental than previous efforts, the album featured new drummer Barry Stern, formerly of Zoetrope).

The group embarked on a year-long tour before returning to the studio. In 1992, Manic Frustration was released, delving into Beatlesque psychedelia and featuring some of Trouble's most aggressive, energetic performances ever. But after the album failed to connect with a wider audience, the band was ultimately dropped by their record company, which was experiencing financial problems.

The band issued Plastic Green Head through the Music for Nations label in 1995, with the return of founding drummer Jeff Olson.

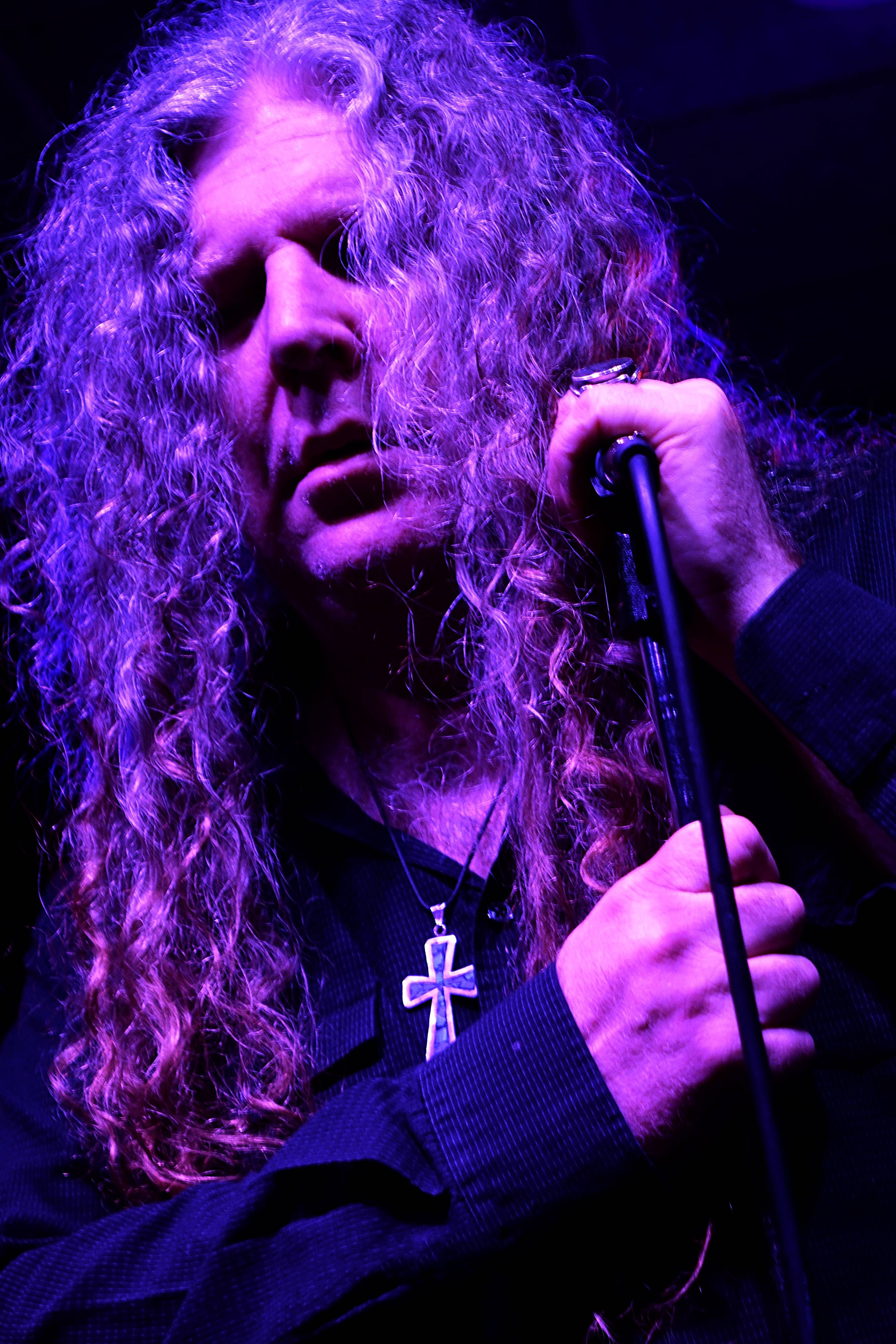
Eric Wagner

=== Reunion and Simple Mind Condition (1997–2007) ===
Even though Trouble had gone on an extended hiatus after Wagner's departure, rumors of an eventual re-formation persisted. From 1997 to 2000, Wagner was replaced by former Exhorder singer Kyle Thomas, who played four public gigs with Trouble.

On January 26, 2002, Wagner, Franklin, Wartell, Holzner, and Olson performed a short set in Chicago where during their smoking rendition of Black Sabbaths' Children of The Grave with Scott Davidson sitting in on the drums, the P.A. gave out and left the crowd in a stunning uproar. Since that time, the band has played individual gigs throughout the Chicago area and headlined metal festivals in Europe and the U.S. while working on a new album. A concert in Stockholm, Sweden in 2005 produced the live DVD "Trouble – Live in Stockholm" with members Eric Wagner, Rick Wartell, Bruce Franklin, Jeff Olson, and Chuck Robinson.

In February 2004, Dave Grohl of Nirvana and the Foo Fighters released a tribute album that paid homage to his metal roots. Entitled Probot, the disc featured various vocalists, including Eric Wagner, who sang on the track "My Tortured Soul". In the album's liner notes, Grohl wrote that buying Psalm 9 was like buying Sgt. Pepper's Lonely Hearts Club Band.

Holzner left the band soon after, to be replaced by Chuck Robinson, who played on the band's newest studio album, Simple Mind Condition, which was released in Europe on April 3, 2007, by Escapi Music. The band toured internationally in support of its release, but were not able to secure a U.S. release date for the album until over two years later. An unplugged album was later released through the band's website and, more recently, Escapi Music.

=== New singers and The Distortion Field (2008–present) ===
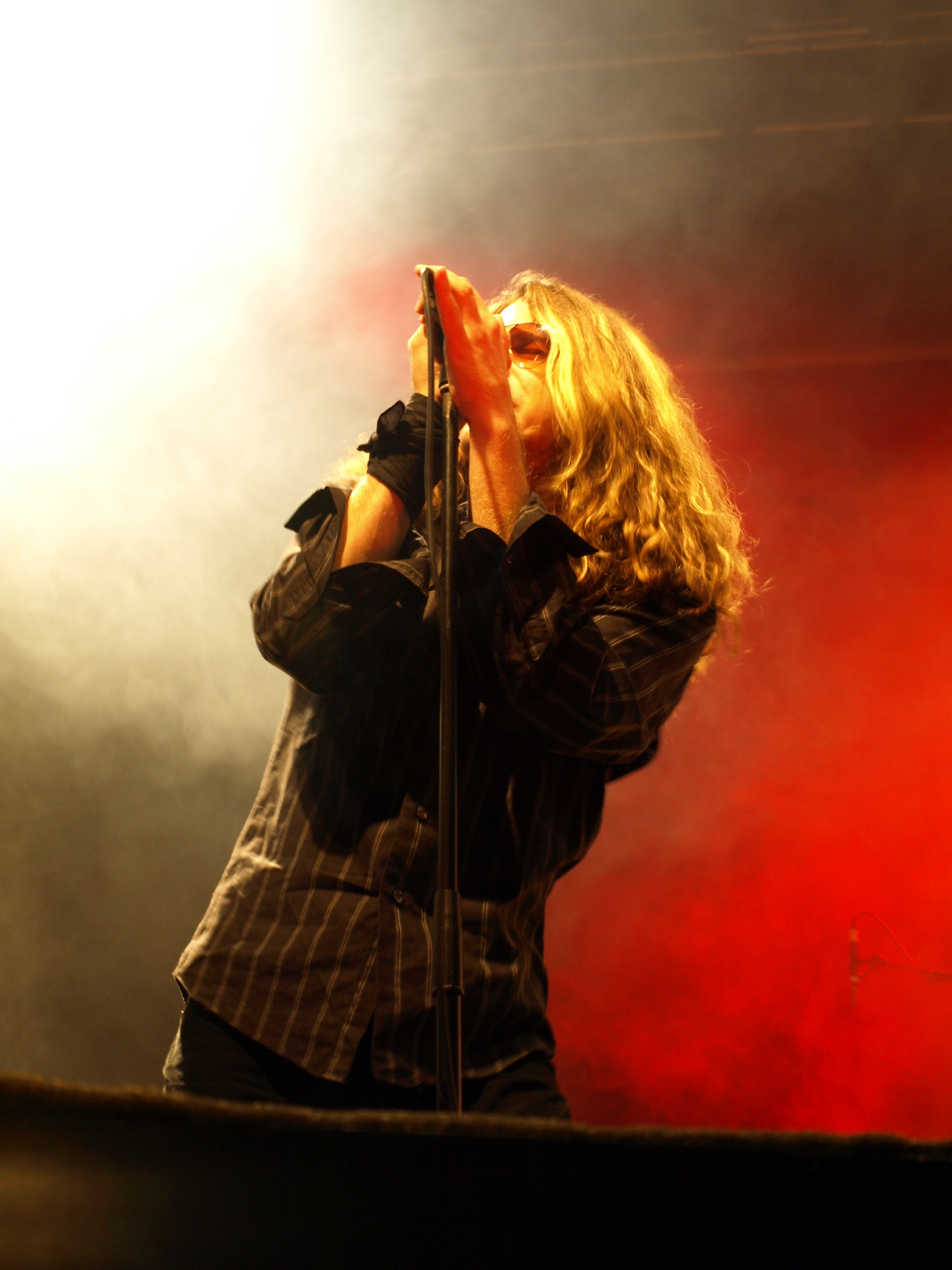
Kory Clarke

In May 2008, it was announced that Eric Wagner had left the band and had been replaced by Kory Clarke of Warrior Soul. Jeff Olson also announced his departure from the band in July 2008 to continue with his own band, Retro Grave. Olson's last show with Trouble was, coincidentally, at a rock club called, "The End" in Memphis, Tenn. Olson was replaced by Wet Animal's Mark Lira for the band's upcoming U.S. East Coast tour.

In a September 2008 interview with Rock N Roll Experience, guitarist Rick Wartell mentioned that Trouble had written "eight or nine songs" for their next album, and would begin recording it after touring. When asked which direction is the new music going in, Wartell replied, "I know people have said this a million times and I know you've heard this a million times, but it's pretty fucking heavy, let's put it that way! The music end of it that Bruce [Franklin, guitar] and I are writing is getting heavier and heavier...it's getting heavier, and then we want Kory to incorporate his style into what we are doing, that's basically all that we really want out of this."

On November 18, 2008, Trouble announced, via their website, that they were in the process of writing songs for an album that would likely be released in the summer of 2009. A live bootleg recording featuring the new line-up was released via the band's website in 2008, then worldwide by Escapi Music about one year later. On March 4, 2009, Trouble revealed on their website that the new album would tentatively be called The Dark Riff. On September 9, 2010, the band announced that they are "getting ready for the studio now. [We] have been making preliminary recordings and working out things to bring the best possible Trouble release." Bruce Franklin later said in a 2009 interview that The Dark Riff would not be the title of the forthcoming album.

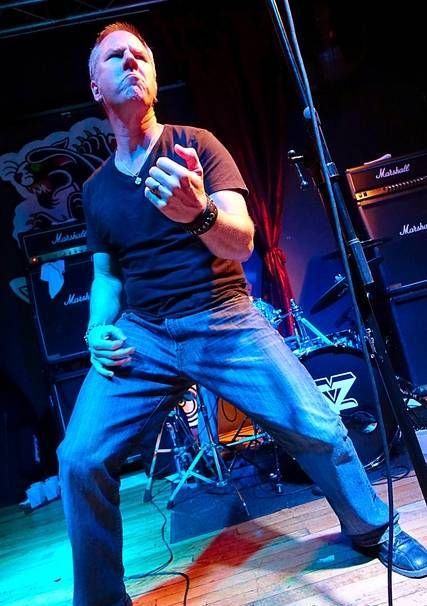
Kyle Thomas

In February 2012, Kory Clarke left Trouble. Kyle Thomas, who was with the band from 1997 to 2000, took his place. Also in February 2012, two original members of Trouble — vocalist Eric Wagner and drummer Jeff Olson — joined forces with the band's longtime bassist Ron Holzner in a new heavy rock/doom metal act called The Skull. According to a statement on the band's Facebook page, "The Skull is here to do one thing... rock you with the sounds and spirit of Trouble — past, present, future. The Skull did a thirty-year celebration tour of Trouble's debut album, Psalm 9, in 2014.

On February 16, 2013, Jeff Olson announced that he would be playing some keyboard intros on the new album. In May 2013, it was announced that the new album, The Distortion Field, was scheduled to be released July 16 in North America and July 26 in Europe. This was the first release to feature Kyle Thomas and was produced by Bill Metoyer. Shortly after its release, Rob Hultz of Solace and Godspeed joined the band as a bassist.

In 2014, Wartell announced that Trouble had begun working on new material for the follow-up to The Distortion Field. No news or progress on the album had been reported until July 2022, when the band entered the studio to start recording it.

Original Trouble singer Eric Wagner died of complications from COVID-19 on August 22, 2021 at the age of 62.

== Artistry ==
At a time when heavy metal was moving forward faster than ever thanks to the advent and growing popularity of thrash metal, Chicago's Trouble embodied a nostalgic throwback to the genre's old-school '70s values -- and specifically a preference for the deliberate, slow-creeping style of the genre's founding fathers, Black Sabbath, which, in the able hands of Trouble and California's similarly backward-gazing Saint Vitus, came to be known as doom metal.

— Eduardo Rivadavia of AllMusic

Trouble's music lies with a traditional doom metal style, although their albums since 1990s Trouble showcase a more stoner metal oriented style. Band members have cited influences by the early heavy rock bands of the 1970s such as Deep Purple, Led Zeppelin, Budgie, and Black Sabbath. Trouble have also incorporated elements of psychedelic rock to their style. Their use of slow tempos was notable at a time when NWOBHM and thrash metal bands were increasingly incorporating fast-picking and speed into their songwriting. While most slow songs by metal bands border into the area of ballads, all of the tracks on Trouble's second album The Skull are as heavy as they are slow, with a distinctive fuzzy distortion and melodic, integral (rather than superfluous or ostentatious) guitar solos. The band could best be described as combining the riffs and tempos of Black Sabbath with the twin guitar attack of Judas Priest.

Eric Wagner's lyrics deal with different themes, but the early Trouble albums, such as their debut Psalm 9, are known for biblical references. Especially because such themes were relatively uncommon in mainstream metal music of the 1980s, Trouble were then often classified as Christian metal. Other songs deal with social issues; "Bastards Will Pay", for instance, criticizes politicians as hypocritical. From Manic Frustration onwards, more lyrical references have been made to psychedelia, drugs, and hallucinations; "Hello Strawberry Skies" and "Mr. White" stand out as two examples. Corresponding with the increase in psychedelic lyrical themes, Trouble's overall sound has also had a noticeably stronger psychedelic component. Unlike other metal acts of the 1980s, Trouble's members dress in ripped jeans, tight T-shirts, wear round sunglasses and have fringes and outfit accessories more characteristic of the hippie movement such as bandanas and knee patches.

== Legacy and impact ==
Dan Epstein of Guitar World praised Trouble as "one of the great lost underground metal bands of all time", adding, "Based in Chicago, the band forged trippy, Sabbath-style damaged hard rock, yet failed to have much more than a small, if rabid, cult following during its long existence." Problems with both the Metal Blade and Def American labels made it impossible for the band to achieve large commercial success. Even though their music videos were aired on MTV in both the U.S. and Europe, Manic Frustration was the only album that sold close to 100,000 copies. However, Eduardo Rivadavia of AllMusic wrote that "their preservation efforts nevertheless rescued metal's original blueprint from disuse, and carved it in granite for subsequent exploration by each new generation of doom bands that followed." It was said that Trouble took up where Black Sabbath had left off after their split with vocalist Ozzy Osbourne. Psalm 9 and The Skull are often cited as the cornerstones of doom metal as well influencing other bands of the uprising metal movement during the mid-1980s. A famous story states that James Hetfield and Kirk Hammett of Metallica entered Trouble's stage after a concert, trying to figure out how their amplifiers were set to produce their unique sound. The band is cited as one of doom metal's "big four", along with Candlemass, Pentagram and Saint Vitus.

Trouble's first two albums were critically acclaimed and are respected in the metal scene. The following album Run to the Light, however, was said to be "disappointing", but a different direction was taken during the Def American era, when Rick Rubin helped the band to develop a new, unique style. The self-titled album gained "magnificent reviews in all the major heavy metal rags" and the psychedelic Manic Frustration was a "critically lauded, cult-raved heavy metal masterpiece". 1995's Plastic Green Head received good reviews and "the album's songs also exuded a palpable sense of wary acceptance." However, Trouble was never thought of as a completely unique group; some critiques dismissed the band as a "poor man's Black Sabbath". Nevertheless, Trouble's influence on the metal movement is unquestioned, with groups such as Corrosion of Conformity, Down, Electric Wizard, Cathedral, Crowbar, Orange Goblin, At the Gates, Confessor, Autopsy, Paradise Lost, Candlemass, Bolt Thrower, and Excel citing them as an influence. Trouble also had a notable influence on the Crust Punk movement, with their slower tempo guitar riffs directly influencing the styles sound.

== Band members ==
Current

- Rick Wartell – guitars (1978–present), vocals (1978–1980)
- Bruce Franklin – guitars (1981–present)
- Kyle Thomas – vocals (1997–2000, 2012–present)
- Rob Hultz – bass (2013–present)
- Garry Naples – drums (2024–present)

Former

- Mike DiPrima – bass (1978–1979)
- Mike Slopecki – drums (1978–1979)
- Eric Wagner – vocals (1981–1997, 2000–2008; died 2021)
- Ian Brown – bass (1979–1983)
- Jeff "Oly" Olson – drums (1979–1986, 1993–2008)
- Sean McAllister – bass (1983–1986)
- Ron Holzner – bass (1986–2002)
- Dennis Lesh – drums (1986–1987)
- Ted Kirkpatrick – drums (1987–1989; died 2022)
- Barry Stern – drums (1989–1993; died 2005)
- Chuck Robinson – bass (2002–2009)
- Kory Clarke – vocals (2008–2012)
- Shane Pasqualla – bass (2009–2013)
- Mark Lira – drums (2008–2024)

== Discography ==
=== Studio albums ===
Title	Year of release	Label
Psalm 9 (formerly 'Trouble')	1984	Metal Blade
The Skull	1985	Metal Blade
Run to the Light	1987	Metal Blade
Trouble	1990	Def American
Manic Frustration	1992	Def American
Plastic Green Head	1995	Century Media
Simple Mind Condition	2007	Escapi Music
The Distortion Field	2013	FRW Records

=== Live releases ===
- Trouble Live (1983, a live cassette sold by the band before being signed to Metal Blade Records, available on CDR through the band's website)
- Trouble Live Dallas Bootleg (1990, a live concert originally broadcast by radio during the band's tour for the self-titled album on Def American, available on CDR through the band's website)
- Live in L.A. (2008)
- Live in Palatine 1989 (2010)
- Live in Schaumberg 1993 (2010)
- Live 1983 (2011)
- Black Shapes of Doom (2011)

=== EPs ===
- Knocking on Heavy's Door (1992; split with Massacra, Tanner, Megalomaniax)
- Unplugged (2007)

=== Demos ===
- 1980 Demo (1980)
- 1982 Demo (1982)
- 1983 Demo (1983)
- Live (1983)
- 1985 Demo (1985)
- One for the Road (1994)

=== DVDs ===
- Live in Stockholm (2005)
- Trouble Videos (2007)
