= Eric Wagner =

American heavy metal singer (1959–2021)

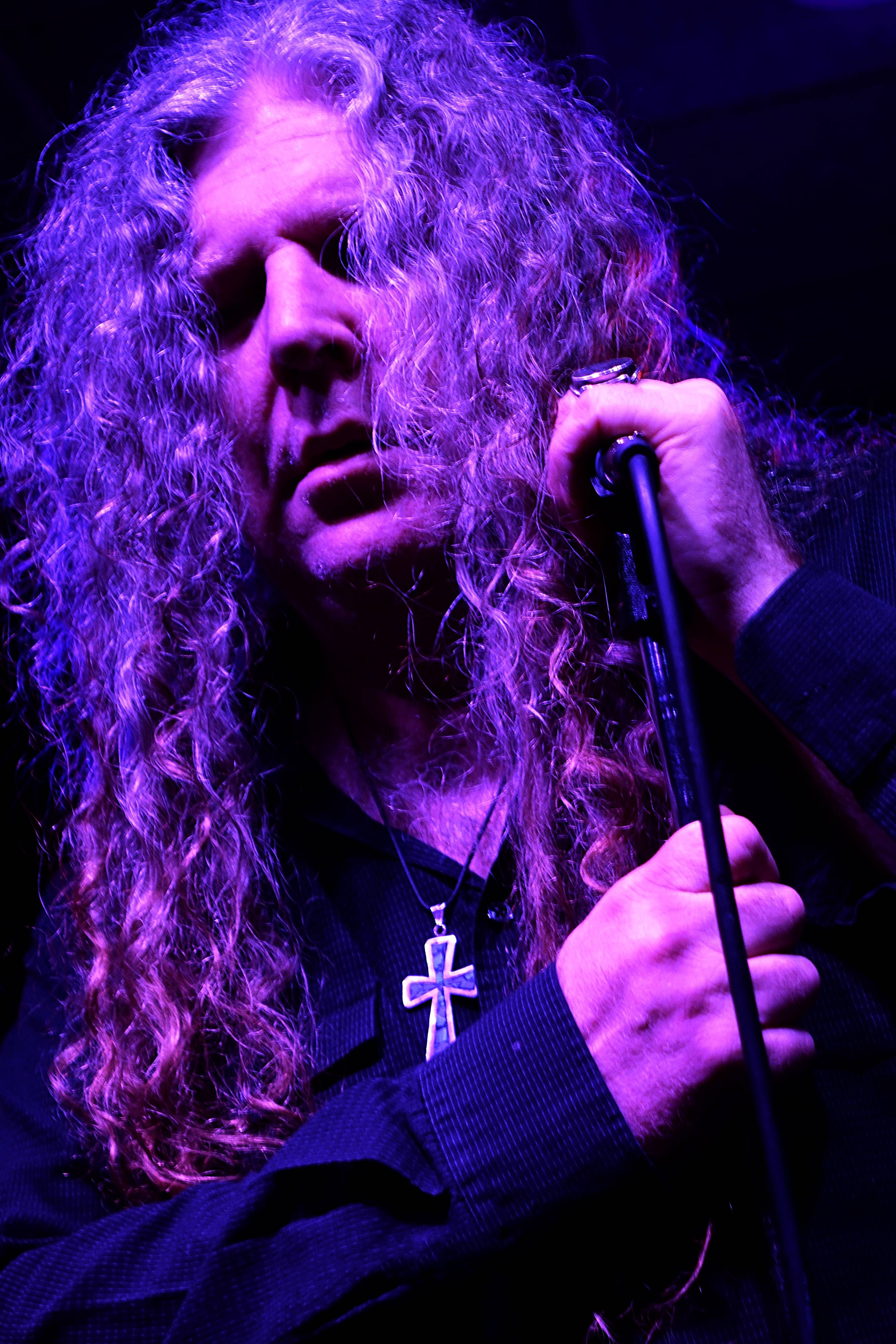
- Wagner in 2018

Background information
- Born: April 24, 1959
- Died: August 22, 2021 (aged 62) Las Vegas, Nevada, U.S.
- Genres: Doom metal, heavy metal, psychedelic rock
- Occupations: Singer, songwriter
- Years active: 1979–2021
- Labels: Metal Blade, Def American, Century Media
- Formerly of: Trouble, Lid, Blackfinger, The Skull
- Website: ericwagnermusic.com

Eric Wagner (April 24, 1959 – August 22, 2021) was an American heavy metal singer, best known for his work with doom metal band Trouble.

== Career ==
Wagner formed Trouble in 1979. He briefly left the band in the mid-1990s and formed Lid with guitarist Daniel Cavanagh, resulting in 1997's In the Mushroom. He also appeared on Dave Grohl's heavy metal side-project Probot in 2004 with the song "My Tortured Soul".

He rejoined Trouble in 2000, and recorded one more album with them, Simple Mind Condition (2007), before leaving the band once again in May 2008 to pursue other musical interests and projects.

Wagner had also been recording under the band name Blackfinger. He also formed The Skull, which features former Trouble bassist Ron Holzner.

== Death ==
Wagner died from complications of COVID-19 in Las Vegas on August 22, 2021, at the age of 62. According to bassist Ron Holzner, Wagner refused to be vaccinated before his death because he was "generally opposed to institutionalized medicine". Wagner completed his solo album, In the Lonely Light of Mourning, before his death. It was released posthumously on Cruz Del Sur Music.

== Discography ==
=== Solo albums ===
- 2022: In the Lonely Light of Mourning

=== Compilation Albums Featuring Trouble ===
- 1983: Metal Massacre 4 – "The Last Judgment"

=== Albums with Trouble ===
- 1984: Psalm 9
- 1985: The Skull
- 1987: Run to the Light
- 1990: Trouble
- 1992: Manic Frustration
- 1995: Plastic Green Head
- 2007: Simple Mind Condition

=== Albums with Lid ===
- 1997: In the Mushroom

=== Albums with Blackfinger ===
- 2014: Blackfinger
- 2017: When Colors Fade Away

=== Albums with The Skull ===
- 2014: For Those Which Are Asleep
- 2018: The Endless Road Turns Dark

=== Guest appearances ===
2004: Probot – "My Tortured Soul" (vocals on one track)
