= Bruce Franklin (guitarist) =

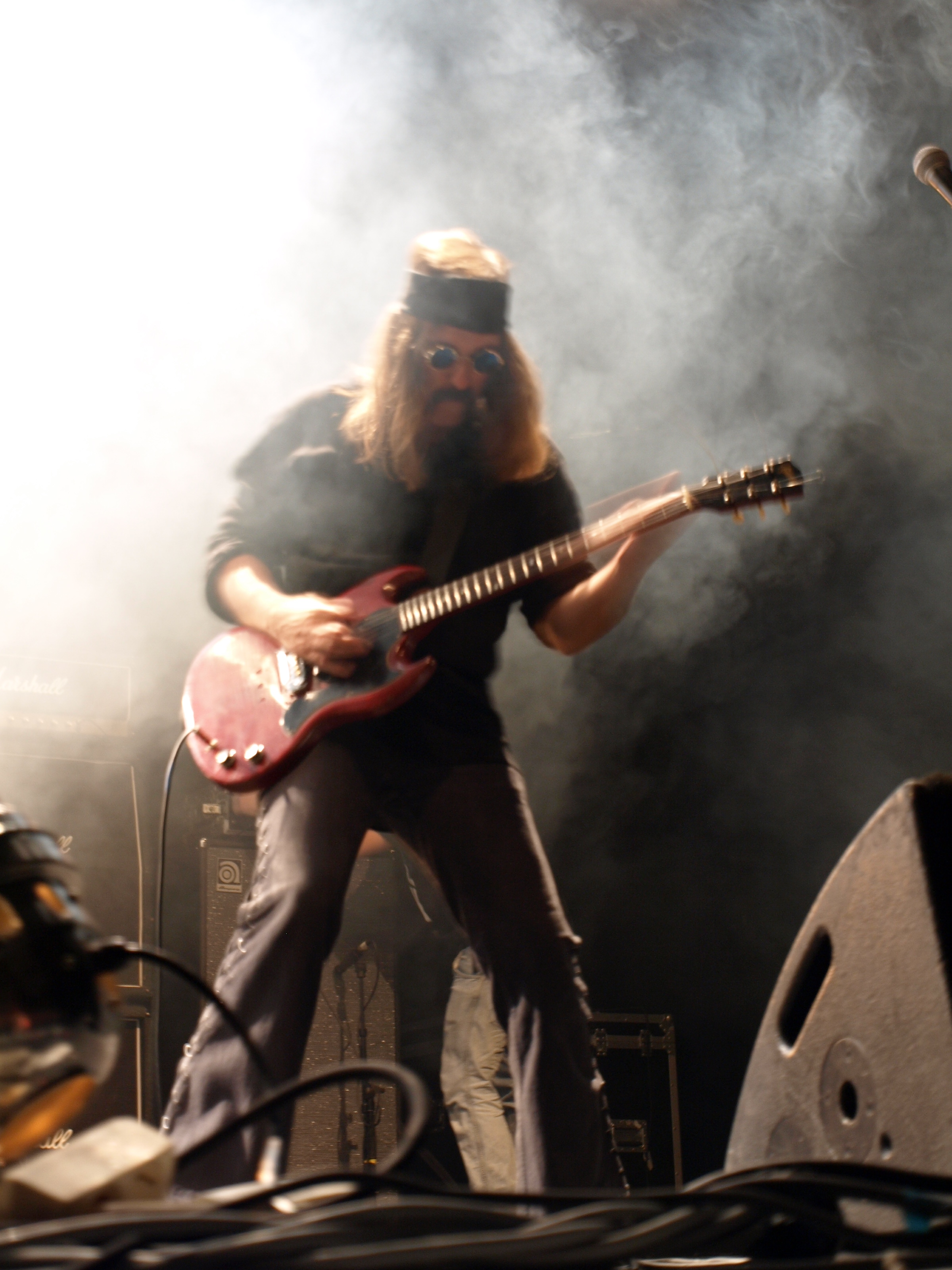
- Franklin performing with Trouble in 2008

Background information
- Origin: Chicago, Illinois, U.S.
- Genres: Doom metal, stoner rock, psychedelic rock
- Occupation: Musician
- Instrument: Guitar
- Years active: 1979–present
- Labels: Metal Blade, Escapi Music

Bruce Franklin is an American musician. He is a founding member and guitarist for doom metal band Trouble. In 1979, he formed the band with his hometown friends Eric Wagner, Rick Wartell, Jeff Olson, and Ian Brown. After touring the Midwest and gaining popularity, Trouble was signed to Metal Blade Records in 1983.

Franklin is also a member of the band Supershine featuring King's X frontman Doug Pinnick and longtime Trouble drummer Jeff Olson. Franklin appeared as a guest lead guitarist on Tourniquet's 2003 album Where Moth and Rust Destroy, and again on their 2012 album Antiseptic Bloodbath. He also played guitar on Generation's 1993 album Brutal Reality.

Franklin's main influence growing up was guitarist Tony Iommi. He implements down tuned heavy metal riffs similar to Black Sabbath's, but mixed with highly psychedelic leads of Rick Wartell. Trouble is often considered one of the earliest bands to synthesize doom metal, heavy metal and psychedelic rock.
