= Saint Vitus discography =

- Studio albums: 9
- Extended plays: 2
- Live albums: 3
- Compilation albums: 1
- Singles: 3
- Video albums: 1
- Demo albums: 4

The discography of Saint Vitus consists of nine studio albums, three live albums, two EPs, one compilation album, one live DVD, three singles and four self-released demos (two of which were recorded under its original name Tyrant).

== Studio albums ==
Year	Title
1984	Saint Vitus: Record label: SST Records; Released: 1984; Format: CD, LP, cassette, digital download
1985	Hallow's Victim: Record label: SST Records; Released: August 1985; Format: CD, LP, cassette, digital download
1986	Born Too Late: Record label: SST Records; Released: October 1986; Format: CD, LP, cassette, digital download
1988	Mournful Cries: Record label: SST Records; Released: August 22, 1988; Format: CD, LP, cassette, digital download
1990	V: Record label: Hellhound Records; Released: 1990; Format: CD, LP, cassette, digital download
1992	C.O.D.: Record label: Hellhound Records; Released: September 1992; Format: CD, LP, cassette, digital download
1995	Die Healing: Record label: Hellhound Records; Released: May 9, 1995; Format: CD, LP, cassette, digital download
2012	Lillie: F-65: Record label: Season of Mist; Released: April 27, 2012 (Europe); Format: CD, CD+DVD, LP, digital download
2019	Saint Vitus: Record label: Season of Mist; Released: May 17, 2019; Format: CD, LP, digital download

== Live albums ==
Year	Title
1990	Live: Record label: Hellhound Records; Released: September 1990; Format: CD, LP, cassette, digital download
2012	Marbles in the Moshpit: Buried by Time and Dust Records; Released: December 2012; Format: LP
2016	Live Vol. 2: Record label: Season of Mist; Released: September 23, 2016; Format: CD, LP

== Compilation albums ==
Year	Title
1991	Heavier Than Thou: Record label: SST Records; Released: July 1, 1991; Format: CD, LP, cassette, digital download

== Extended plays ==
Year	Title
1985	The Walking Dead: Record label: SST Records; Released: 1985; Format: vinyl
1987	Thirsty and Miserable: Record label: SST Records; Released: 1987; Format: Vinyl, cassette

== Singles ==
Year	Title
1985	War Is Our Destiny: Record label: SST Records; Released: 1985; Format: 12" vinyl; Info: Promo, Same track on both sides
2011	Saint Vitus/Born Too Late: Record label: Volcom; Released: January 2011; Format: 7" Vinyl; Info: Recorded live 2009 & 2010
2012	Blessed Night/Look Behind You: Record label: Season of Mist; Released: March 2012; Format: 7" Vinyl; Info: B-Side is recorded live 2010

== Video albums ==
Year	Title
2007	Reunion 2003 - Live in Chicago: Record label: Self-released; Released: 2007; Format: DVD

== Demo albums ==
Year	Album details
1978	Rehearsal (as Tyrant): Record label: Self-released; Released: 1978; Format: cassette
1979	Demo 1979 (as Tyrant): Record label: Self-released; Released: 1979; Format: cassette
1983	1983 Demo (as Saint Vitus): Record label: Self-released; Released: 1983; Format: cassette
1992	Demo (as Saint Vitus): Record label: Self-released; Released: 1992; Format: cassette
