= Saint Vitus (disambiguation) =

Saint Vitus (290-303) is a Christian saint, martyred during the Roman persecution of Christians.

Saint Vitus, St. Vitus, or variations, may also refer to:

- Saint Vitus (venue), a bar and music venue in Brooklyn, New York
- Saint Vitus (band), an American doom metal band
  - Saint Vitus (1984 album)
  - Saint Vitus (2019 album)
- St. Vitus (drink), a German bitters
- St. Vitus's Church (disambiguation), several churches and cathedrals of the name
- Vidovdan, or Saint Vitus Day, the Saint's feast day celebrated on June 15 on the Julian calendar and June 28 on the Gregorian calendar
- Saint Vitus' dance (disambiguation)

== See also ==
- Sankt Veit (disambiguation) (German: Saint Vitus)
- San Vito (disambiguation) (Italian: Saint Vitus)
- St. Vith (French: Saint Vitus), Belgium
  - Battle of St. Vith (1944) during WWII
- Canton of Sankt-Vith (Walloon: Saint Vitus), Belgium; part of Eupen Sankt Vith
