= Saint Vitus (2019 album) =

Studio album by Saint Vitus
- Released: May 17, 2019
- Recorded: 2017–2018
- Studio: Heavyhead Recording Co. Port Orchard, WA (US)
- Genre: Doom metal
- Length: 41:05
- Label: Season of Mist/Bandcamp
- Producer: Tony Reed

Saint Vitus chronology
Lillie: F-65 (2012)	Saint Vitus (2019)

Saint Vitus is the ninth studio album by American doom metal band Saint Vitus, first released on May 17, 2019. The album shares its title with both the band themselves and their 1984 debut album.

As one reviewer said "In the world of doom metal, Saint Vitus is without question one of the most iconic and recognized acts around", so this album had been long awaited.

It is the first Saint Vitus studio album since Lillie: F-65 in 2012 which had Scott “Wino” Weinrich on vocals, but as in the original 1984 Saint Vitus album, Scott Reagers returns here on vocals, the first time on a studio album since Die Healing.

In an interview on The Obelisk Dave Chandler described the album being called Saint Vitus, like the first album, as coming full circle.

It also marks the band's first album with Pat Bruders on bass, replacing bassist Mark Adams, who left the band in 2016 due to Parkinson's disease before his death in 2023.

== Track listing ==
No.	Title	Length
1.	"Remains (Chandler)"	06:23
2.	"A Prelude to... (Chandler, Bruders)"	03:19
3.	"Bloodshed (Chandler)"	03:03
4.	"12 Years In The Tomb (Chandler)"	05:23
5.	"Wormhole (Chandler, Bruders)"	05:22
6.	"Hour Glass (Henry Vasquez)"	05:22
7.	"City Park (Chandler)"	04:00
8.	"Last Breath (Chandler)"	06:37
9.	"Useless (Chandler)"	01:31

== Personnel ==
Saint Vitus

- Pat Bruders – bass
- Dave Chandler – guitar
- Scott Reagers – vocals
- Henry Vasquez – drums

Production

- Tony Reed – producer, engineer, mixing and mastering
