= Sloth (disambiguation) =

A sloth is a mammal of the rainforests in the Americas.

Sloth or Sloths may also refer to:

- Sloth (sin), laziness, one of the seven deadly sins

== Animals ==
- Ground sloth, an extinct mammal of the Americas
- Sloth bear, a bear of India
- Sloth lemur, an extinct lemur

== Arts ==
- Flash Slothmore, a character in the Zootopia film franchise
- Sid the Sloth, a character in the Ice Age film franchise
- Sloth, a deformed man in The Goonies, a 1985 American adventure comedy film
- Sloth, a 2006 graphic novel by Gilbert Hernandez
- Sloth (Fullmetal Alchemist), a manga and anime character
- "Sloths!", an SNL Digital Short from the American late-night live television variety show

=== Music ===
- "Sloth", a song by Fairport Convention from the 1970 album Full House
- "The Sloth", a song by Phish from the 1987 album The Man Who Stepped into Yesterday
- "Sloth", a song by Saint Vitus from the 1995 album Die Healing

== People ==
- Casper Sloth (born 1992), Danish footballer
- Charlie Sloth (born 1987), British hip hop artist, actor, TV presenter and DJ
- Jørn Sloth (born 1944), Danish chess player and former world champion of correspondence chess
