= Nailed =

Nailed may refer to:

- Nailed (Cecil Taylor album), 2000
- Nailed (Place of Skulls album), 2001
- Nailed, a 1987 demo album by the Crucified
- "Nailed" (Better Call Saul), a television episode
- "Nailed" (CSI: Miami), a television episode
- Accidental Love, working title Nailed, a 2015 film by David O. Russell
- Nailed, a 2001 film starring Harvey Keitel
- Nailed, a play by Caleb Lewis

== See also ==
- Nail (disambiguation)
