= Premonition 13 =

Doom metal project by Scott Weinrich

- Origin: Maryland, United States
- Genres: Doom metal
- Years active: 2010–2012
- Label: Volcom
- Past members: Scott "Wino" Weinrich; Jim Karow; Matthew Clark; Brian Daniloski
- Website: premonition13.com

Premonition 13 (also Wino's Premonition) is a project by The Obsessed and Saint Vitus' vocalist/guitarist Scott "Wino" Weinrich. The project started in 2009 with Wino's jam colleague of 20 years Jim Karow. Matthew Clark was later brought in to play drums.

== Members ==
- Scott "Wino" Weinrich — vocals, guitars, bass
- Jim Karow — guitars, vocals
- Matthew Clark — drums
- Brian Daniloski — bass (live session)

== Discography ==
- "Switchhouse" / "Crossthreaded" (single), 2011
- 13 (album), 2011
- Premonition 13 / Radio Moscow / Earthless — split 12" (EP), 2012 (track: "Noche Oscura")
