= The Walking Dead (EP) =

EP by Saint Vitus
- Released: 1985
- Recorded: 1985
- Studio: Total Access Recording, Redondo Beach, California
- Genre: Doom metal, heavy metal
- Length: 20:22
- Label: SST (042)
- Producer: SPOT, Joe Carducci, Saint Vitus

Saint Vitus chronology
Hallow's Victim (1985)	The Walking Dead (1985)	Born Too Late (1986)

Professional ratings
Review scores
Source	Rating
AllMusic	2.5/5 stars

The Walking Dead is an EP by the American doom metal band Saint Vitus, released in 1985 through SST Records. This is the last release to feature original singer Scott Reagers, until he returned for Die Healing (1995). The EP was released on 12" vinyl in 1985, but there was no CD release until 2010. In that format, it was typically included with the band's 1985 LP, Hallow's Victim.

== Track listing ==
1. "Darkness" - 3:26
2. "White Stallions" - 5:24
3. "The Walking Dead" - 11:32

== Personnel ==
=== Saint Vitus ===
- Scott Reagers - vocals
- Dave Chandler - guitar
- Mark Adams - bass
- Armando Acosta - drums

=== Production ===
- Joe Carducci - producer
- SPOT - producer, engineer
