= With Vision =

Studio album by Place of Skulls
- Released: September 23, 2003
- Genre: Doom metal
- Length: 50:33
- Label: Southern Lord
- Producer: Travis Wyrick, Victor Griffin

Place of Skulls chronology
Nailed (2001)	With Vision (2003)	The Black Is Never Far (2006)

Professional ratings
Review scores
Source	Rating
AllMusic	3/5 stars

With Vision is the second studio album release by Place of Skulls. It was released in 2003 on the Southern Lord Records label. The recording of this album was marked by numerous personnel changes before the final staff was assembled. This is the only Place of Skulls album to feature Scott Weinrich (of The Obsessed, Saint Vitus, Spirit Caravan fame) on vocals and second guitar. He left to concentrate on The Hidden Hand. Writing credits are far more widely distributed among the band members than on their previous album.

== Track listing ==
Songwriters are listed in brackets.

1. "Last Hit" (Griffin, Greg Turley, Weinrich) – 3:42
2. "With Vision" (Griffin) – 6:08
3. "Long Lost Grave" (Weinrich) – 5:54
4. "Nothing Changes" (Griffin, Turley) – 5:01
5. "Dimensional Sojourn" (Weinrich) – 2:49
6. "In Rest" (Griffin) – 1:21
7. "Silver Cord Breaks" (Griffin) – 5:23
8. "Willfully Blind" (Turley, Weinrich) – 3:08
9. "Dissonant Dissident" (Weinrich) – 1:52
10. "The Monster" (Griffin) – 5:01
11. "The Watchers" (Weinrich) – 4:38
12. "Lost" (Griffin) – 5:36

== Personnel ==
- Scott "Wino" Weinrich – guitar, vocals
- Greg Turley – bass
- Tim Tomaselli – drums
- Mike Dearing – digital editing, assistant engineer
- Jennifer Black – layout design
- Travis Wyrick – producer, engineer, digital editing, mixing
- Victor Griffin – guitar, vocals, producer, design
