= The Black Is Never Far =

Studio album by Place of Skulls
- Released: May 2, 2006
- Genre: Doom metal
- Length: 45:39
- Label: Exile on Mainstream
- Producer: Travis Wyrick, Victor Griffin

Place of Skulls chronology
With Vision (2003)	The Black Is Never Far (2006)	As a Dog Returns (2010)

Professional ratings
Review scores
Source	Rating
AllMusic	2.5/5 stars

The Black is Never Far is the third studio album by American doom metal band Place of Skulls. It was released in 2006 on the Exile on Mainstream label. Scott Weinrich left the band prior to the recording in order to focus on The Hidden Hand.

== Track listing ==
All songs written by Victor Griffin except where noted.

- 1. "Prisoner's Creed" – 2:50
- 2. "Sense of Divinity" – 4:12
- 3. "Darkest Hour" – 5:59
- 4. "Interlude" – 0:10
- 5. "Apart from Me" (Cornelius, Griffin) – 4:41
- 6. "The Black Is Never Far" – 6:01
- 7. "We the Unrighteous" – 2:38
- 8. "Interlude" – 0:13
- 9. "Masters of Jest" – 4:10
- 10. "Interlude" – 0:13
- 11. "Lookin' for a Reason" – 6:26
- 12. "Relentless" – 4:28
- 13. "Changed Heart" – 3:38

== Personnel ==
- Victor Griffin – guitar, vocals, producer
- Lee Abney – bass, backing vocals
- Dennis Cornelius – bass, vocals, backing vocals
- Charles Robinson – backing vocals
- Tim Tomaselli – drums, backing vocals
- Chastity Brown – saxophone
- Travis Wyrick – producer, mastering, mixing
- Mike Dearing – engineer
- Andreas Kohl – artwork, design, layout design
