= Born Too Late =

Studio album by Saint Vitus
- Released: October 1986
- Recorded: 1986
- Studio: Total Access Recording (Redondo Beach, California)
- Genre: Doom metal
- Length: 34:36
- Label: SST (082)
- Producers: Joe Carducci, Saint Vitus

Saint Vitus chronology
The Walking Dead (1985)	Born Too Late (1986)	Thirsty and Miserable (1987)

Professional ratings
Review scores
Source	Rating
AllMusic	4/5 stars
Collector's Guide to Heavy Metal	7/10

Born Too Late is the third studio album by American doom metal band Saint Vitus, released in 1986. It was the first Saint Vitus album featuring The Obsessed singer Scott "Wino" Weinrich. It is generally cited as their greatest effort.

All the songs from this album except "The War Starter" are featured on the band's compilation album Heavier Than Thou.

On April 11, 2009, "Dying Inside" was performed by the band with Phil Anselmo as a guest in New Orleans.

== Music and lyrics ==
Born Too Late has been described as "deeply rooted in the gloomy ballistics of early [Black] Sabbath." The album contains "sludgy, ultra-slow riffs," and omits the "galloping rhythms" that are common in traditional heavy metal. Paul Kott of AllMusic described the album's sound as "Black Sabbath on Quaaludes and wearing lead suits underwater." According to him: "Each chord rains down like a hammer, and each progression takes an eternity to resolve." According to the staff of Revolver Magazine, "The record’s smoked-out vibes, fuzzy riffs and Thorazine-shuffle tempos (as well as Wino’s retro-longhair look and stoner-biker poetry) weren’t just a kiss of death for commercial success, they also blatantly flew in the face of everything deemed cool or trendy within the underground."

The album's lyrics explore themes such as dragons, psychedelic drugs, war, insanity, and alcohol abuse. Kott assessed: "Before almost anyone else had even realized that rock was on its death bed, Saint Vitus were looking back on the '70s with nostalgia. Throughout, the album is what might be considered a cliched retrospective of that bygone era's heavy metal sentiments."

== Reception and legacy ==
Born too Late is now considered to be a highly influential release in the doom metal genre. J. Bennett of Decibel wrote in 2010: "Vitus have been embraced by metalheads everywhere, and [the album] is a stone-cold classic."

Paul Kott of AllMusic gave the album four stars out of five in his retrospective review, which he closed with the statement by stating that originality was not a high priority on the album. He said: "What separates Born Too Late from nearly all heavy metal up to that point was the outright admission that the band's passion - slow, heavy music - not only lacked commercial viability, but was in fact itself a source of the ridicule and social alienation the music speaks to. The punk rock style integrity of the band's commitment to that sound and image was in direct opposition to the money and chicks attitude of L.A. glam metal of the day. While the impact Saint Vitus made with Born Too Late at the time was minimal, the legacy of that early dedication has influenced and changed the world of music. For all fans of grunge, stoner rock, and doom metal, this album is a classic."

== Track listing ==
All songs written by Dave Chandler, except where noted.

Side one

1. "Born Too Late" (music: Chandler; lyrics: Chandler; Scott Reagers) – 6:52
2. "Clear Windowpane" – 3:14
3. "Dying Inside" – 7:23

Side two

1. "H.A.A.G. (Hell Ain't a Game)" (music: Chandler; lyrics: Robert Gonzales) – 5:02
2. "The Lost Feeling" – 5:22
3. "The War Starter" – 6:43

=== CD reissue bonus tracks ===
In 1987, SST re-released Born Too Late on CD and included the Thirsty and Miserable EP tracks, which are as follows.

7. "Thirsty and Miserable" (Dez Cadena, Rosa Medea, ROBO) – 3:51 (Black Flag cover)
8. "Look Behind You" – 3:18
9. "The End of the End" – 5:49

== Personnel ==
Saint Vitus

- Scott "Wino" Weinrich – vocals
- Dave Chandler – guitar
- Mark Adams – bass
- Armando Acosta – drums

Production

- Joe Carducci – producer
- Michael Lardie, Jim Mancuso – engineers
