= Hallow's Victim =

Studio album by Saint Vitus
- Released: 1985
- Recorded: 1985
- Studio: Total Access Recording, Redondo Beach, California
- Genre: Doom metal, heavy metal
- Length: 34:31
- Label: SST (052)
- Producer: SPOT, Joe Carducci, Saint Vitus

Saint Vitus chronology
Saint Vitus (1984)	Hallow's Victim (1985)	The Walking Dead (1985)

Professional ratings
Review scores
Source	Rating
AllMusic	3.5/5 stars
Collector's Guide to Heavy Metal	7/10

Hallow's Victim is the second studio album by the American doom metal band Saint Vitus. It was released in 1985 by SST Records. This album was the last to feature original singer Scott Reagers until their seventh album, Die Healing (1995). Reagers also appears on The Walking Dead EP that was released the same year. It remained the only Saint Vitus album not to be officially released on CD until SST officially released the album on CD in combination with The Walking Dead EP in 2010.

== Track listing ==
All songs written by Dave Chandler, except where noted.

Side one

1. "War Is Our Destiny" (Chandler, Scott Reagers) - 4:05
2. "White Stallions" - 5:21
3. "Mystic Lady" - 7:37

Side two

1. "Hallow's Victim" - 2:40
2. "The Sadist" (Chandler, Reagers) - 3:56
3. "Just Friends (Empty Love)" (Chandler, Reagers) - 5:40
4. "Prayer for the (M)Asses" - 5:12

== Personnel ==
Saint Vitus

- Scott Reagers - vocals
- Dave Chandler - guitar
- Mark Adams - bass
- Armando Acosta - drums

Production

- Joe Carducci - producer
- SPOT - producer, engineer
