= Rock and the Pop Narcotic =

- Third Edition Cover - Features painting of Black Flag based on 2nd ed. cover photo
- Author: Joe Carducci
- Language: English
- Genre: Music criticism
- Publisher: Redoubt Press
- Publication date: First Ed. 1990
- Publication place: United States
- Media type: Print (Paperback)
- Pages: 529 (3rd ed.)
- ISBN: 1-880985-11-X
- OCLC: 34267249

Rock and the Pop Narcotic is a 1990 book of popular music criticism by Joe Carducci. (Revised edition 1995.)

Rock and the Pop Narcotic is perhaps the only book of popular music criticism that attempts to achieve a genuine aesthetic of rock music. Other works, such as Richard Meltzer's The Aesthetics of Rock or Simon Frith's Performing Rites: On the Value of Popular Music, either focus on lyrical content or on the sociology of the music's listeners. Rock and the Pop Narcotic is both a critique of the sociological approach and a polemic in favour of the music's artistic qualities.

== The Book's Argument ==
Carducci seeks to distinguish rock music from pop music.

He regards the rock as an "artistic form" and the pop music as, if anything, a marketing concept. Rock, in Carducci's view, is "rock and roll music made conscious of itself as a small band music".

Unlike many writers on pop music, he rejects the idea that popularity is an index of quality; this attitude leads him to dismiss many major performers, such as U2 and Bruce Springsteen, as artistically null. On the other hand, his obsessive search for music that displays the qualities he regards as intrinsic to rock music leads him to champion such relatively obscure bands as Saint Vitus, Bloodrock, Sproton Layer and The Sylvia Juncosa Band.

== The Book's Structure ==
Though the book has grown in length since the first edition the essential structure remains the same. The book is divided into two parts, The Riff and The Solo followed by several appendices that gather miscellaneous pieces and ephemera.

R&tPN opens with The Riff which is divided into five chapters:

I The King of It & The King of Thing: Outlines the basic argument for the book and describes Carducci's theory of how rock music works.

II Television and Mutation: Documents what he sees as the profound negative impact of television on American culture.

III The Whole World's Switching the Channel: How mass media and other cultural forces have shaped the music business.

IV None Dare Call it Reason: How the music business has warped the music itself.

V Narcorockcritocracy!: The complicity of the rock criticism establishment in the decline of the music.

After a middle section of several band photographs the book continues with The Solo which contains one chapter:

I The Psychozoic Hymnal: A decade-by-decade evaluation of rock bands. Each subsection begins with a listing of and short comment on the best rock artists of the decade in Carducci's view. It then moves onto a more general discussion of the musical trends of the decade and more band evaluations.

The book closes with several appendices which include radio show playlists, catalogs from his time at Systematic, gig posters from Black Flag, Saccharine Trust, etc.

== Reception ==
The book was originally published in a relatively small edition in November 1990. In 1994, Carducci revised it and it was republished by Henry Rollins' 2.13.61 press.

The initial reaction from much of the mainstream rock press was largely a mixture of indifference and hostility. Carducci's tendency was directly counter to the politically progressive and relatively mainstream attitude of such writers as Dave Marsh or Greil Marcus, neither of whom answered the charges Carducci made against them (of ignoring quality music for political reasons).

Only Robert Christgau in the Village Voice praised it in public, calling it "important if not terribly good". Other reviewers took issue with what they perceived as Carducci's homophobia and right-wing politics.

During the rest of the 1990s the book gradually acquired cult status, with record producer Simon Napier-Bell citing it as one of his ten favourite music books in the UK's Guardian newspaper in 2001. Clinton Heylin included two chapters in The Penguin Anthology of Rock and Roll Writing, with the remark, "Rock and the Pop Narcotic...may well be the most important critique on rock music written in the last 10 years."
