= Mournful Cries =

Studio album by Saint Vitus
- Released: August 22, 1988
- Recorded: March 24–27, 1988
- Studio: Music Grinder Studios, Los Angeles, California
- Genre: Doom metal
- Length: 33:01
- Label: SST (161)
- Producer: Saint Vitus, Joe Carducci

Saint Vitus chronology
Thirsty and Miserable (1987)	Mournful Cries (1988)	V (1990)

Professional ratings
Review scores
Source	Rating
AllMusic	3.5/5 stars
Collector's Guide to Heavy Metal	6/10

Mournful Cries is the fourth studio album by American doom metal band Saint Vitus, released in 1988. It was the band's last release on SST Records. The cover art features a painting of a hydra.

== Track listing ==
All songs written by Dave Chandler, except where noted.

Side one

1. "Intro / The Creeps" – 2:47
2. "Dragon Time" – 7:27
3. "Shooting Gallery" – 6:45

Side two

1. "Intro / Bitter Truth" (Scott Weinrich) – 4:14
2. "The Troll" – 6:57
3. "Looking Glass" (Weinrich) – 4:50

== Personnel ==
Saint Vitus

- Scott "Wino" Weinrich – vocals, guitar on tracks 2, 4, 6
- Dave Chandler – guitar, growl on track 2
- Mark Adams – bass
- Armando Acosta – drums

Production

- Joe Carducci – producer
- Casey McMackin & Keith – engineers
