= Heavier Than Thou =

Compilation album by Saint Vitus
- Released: July 1, 1991
- Recorded: 1982–1988
- Genre: Doom metal
- Length: 73:20
- Label: SST (266)

Saint Vitus chronology
Live (1990)	Heavier Than Thou (1991)	C.O.D. (1992)

Professional ratings
Review scores
Source	Rating
AllMusic	4.5/5 stars

Heavier Than Thou is a compilation album by American doom metal band Saint Vitus, released via SST Records in 1991. It features tracks taken from each of their releases on SST. Although the compilation was released after V, it contains none of the songs from that album as Saint Vitus had switched record labels by that time.

== Track listing ==
All songs written by Dave Chandler, except where noted.

1. "Clear Windowpane" - 3:17
2. "Born Too Late" (Chandler, Scott Reagers) - 6:54
3. "Look Behind You" - 3:20
4. "Thirsty and Miserable" (Dez Cadena, Rosa Medea, ROBO) - 3:52
5. "Dying Inside" - 7:25
6. "The Lost Feeling" - 5:25
7. "H.A.A.G." (Chandler, Robert Gonzales) - 5:02
8. "Shooting Gallery" - 6:46
9. "Bitter Truth" (Scott Weinrich) - 4:14
10. "Dragon Time" - 7:36
11. "War Is Our Destiny" (Chandler, Reagers) - 4:11
12. "White Stallions" - 5:26
13. "White Magic/Black Magic" - 5:27
14. "Saint Vitus" - 4:48

== Personnel ==
- Scott "Wino" Weinrich - vocals on tracks 1–10, guitar on tracks 9–10
- Scott Reagers - vocals on tracks 11–14
- Dave Chandler - guitar
- Mark Adams - bass
- Armando Acosta - drums
