= Thirsty and Miserable =

EP by Saint Vitus
- Released: September 27, 1987
- Recorded: 1987
- Genre: Doom metal
- Length: 12:58
- Label: SST (119)
- Producer: Joe Carducci, Saint Vitus

Saint Vitus chronology
Born Too Late (1986)	Thirsty and Miserable (1987)	Mournful Cries (1988)

Professional ratings
Review scores
Source	Rating
AllMusic	2.5/5 stars

Thirsty and Miserable is an EP released by the American doom metal band Saint Vitus in 1987 on SST Records. The title track is a cover of Black Flag. The tracks were released in 1987 on CD by SST as bonus tracks to the Born Too Late album.

== Track listing ==
All songs written by Dave Chandler, except where noted.

1. "Thirsty and Miserable" (Dez Cadena, Rosa Medea, ROBO) – 3:51 (Black Flag cover)
2. "Look Behind You" – 3:18
3. "The End of the End" – 5:49

== Personnel ==
=== Saint Vitus ===
- Scott "Wino" Weinrich - vocals
- Dave Chandler - guitar
- Mark Adams - bass
- Armando Acosta - drums

=== Production ===
- Joe Carducci - producer
- Michael Lardie, Jim Mancuso - engineers
