= Wyns =

Wyns Wijns
- Village
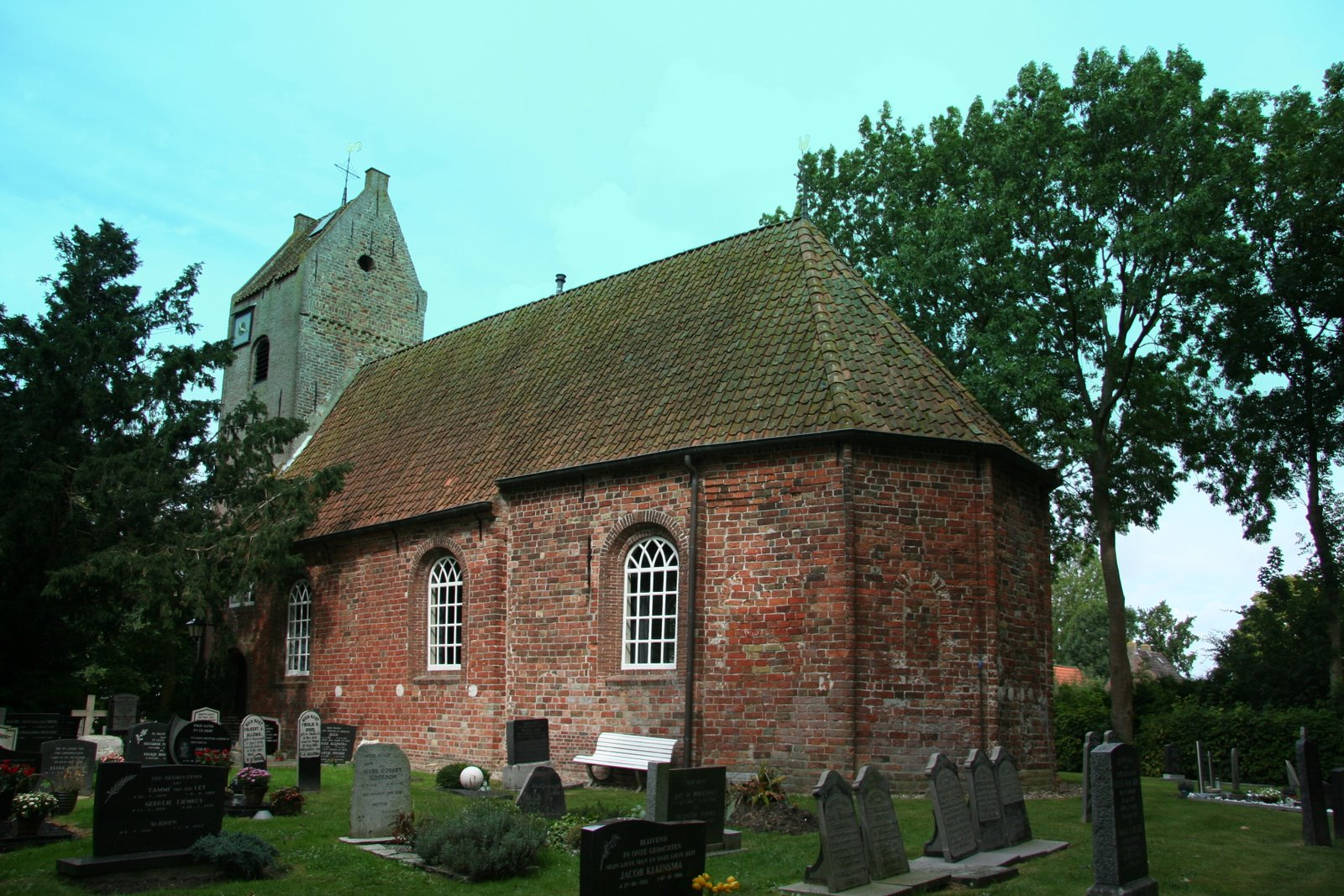
- St Vitus' Church

- Flag Coat of arms

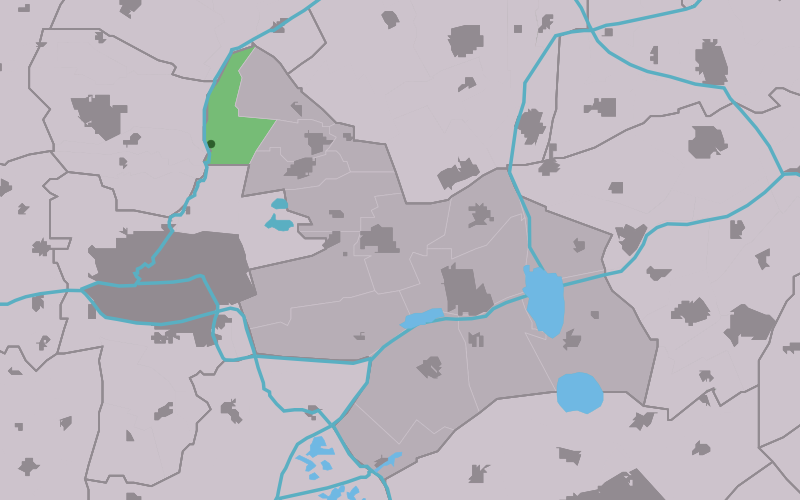
- Location of the village in Tytsjerksteradiel

- Location in the Netherlands Wyns (Netherlands)
- Country: Netherlands
- Province: Friesland
- Municipality: Tytsjerksteradiel

Area
  - Total: 7.74 km^{2} (2.99 sq mi)
- Elevation: 0.4 m (1.3 ft)

Population (2021)
  - Total: 230
  - Density: 30/km^{2} (77/sq mi)
- Time zone: UTC+1 (CET)
  - Summer (DST): UTC+2 (CEST)
- Postal code: 9091
- Dialing code: 058

For the FM station in Waynesville, Ohio see WYNS-FM

Wyns (Dutch: Wijns) is a village in Tytsjerksteradiel municipality in the province of Friesland, the Netherlands.It had a population of approximately 228 in January 2017.

== History ==
The village was first mentioned in 1224 as Winenge, and means "settlement of the people of Wago (person)". Wyns is a terp (artificial living hill) village from the middle ages located on the Dokkumer Ee.

The Protestant church that was built around 1200 has been renovated to form a multifunctional centre. Wyns was in the Middle Ages notable for all lawsuits of Eastergoa being held there and the Grietmans sometimes holding meetings in the church.

Wyns home was to 110 people in 1840. The polder mill Wynzer Mûne was built in 1871. It remained in service until 1975 when a Diesel powered pumping station was built. The wind mill is designated as an emergency backup. In 1893, a dairy factory was built in Wyns. It has redesigned as a ship wharf. Near the inn, there is ferry across the Dokkumer Ee.

== Notable buildings ==
- The Protestant church of Wyns

== Gallery ==
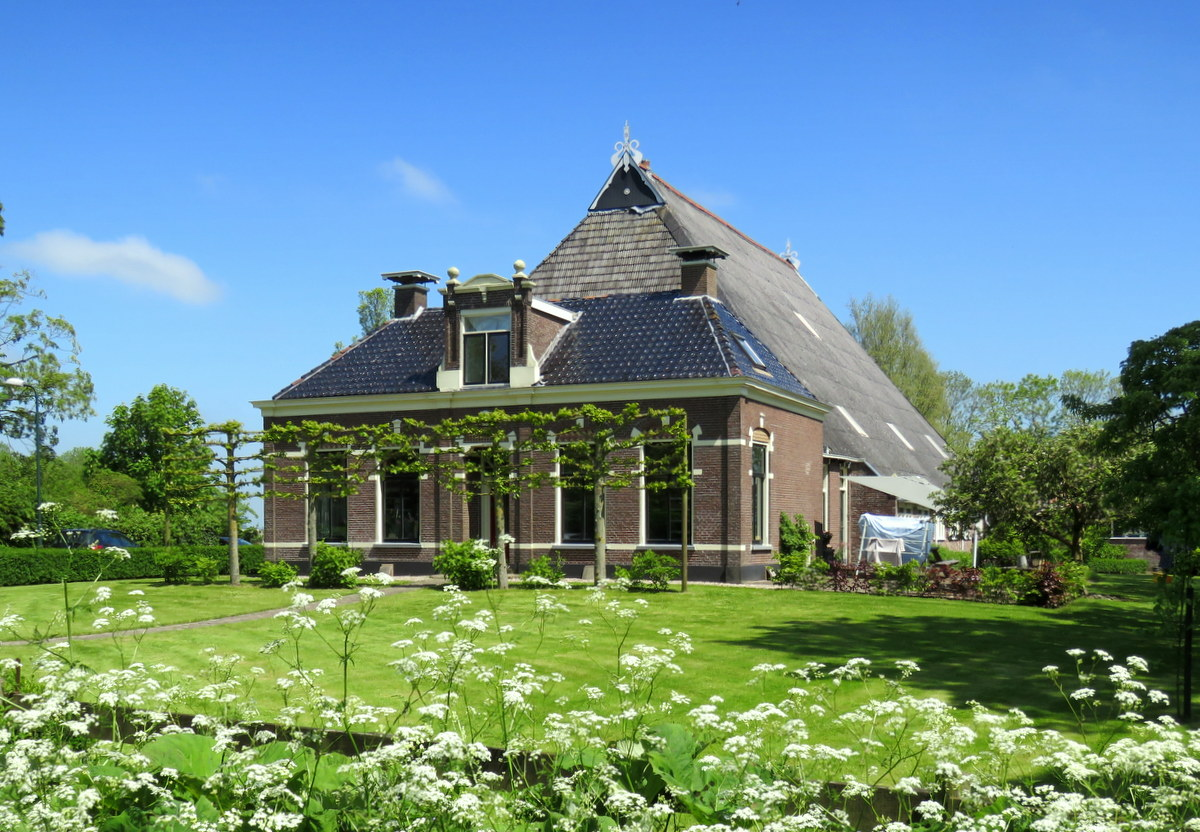
Farm in Wyns

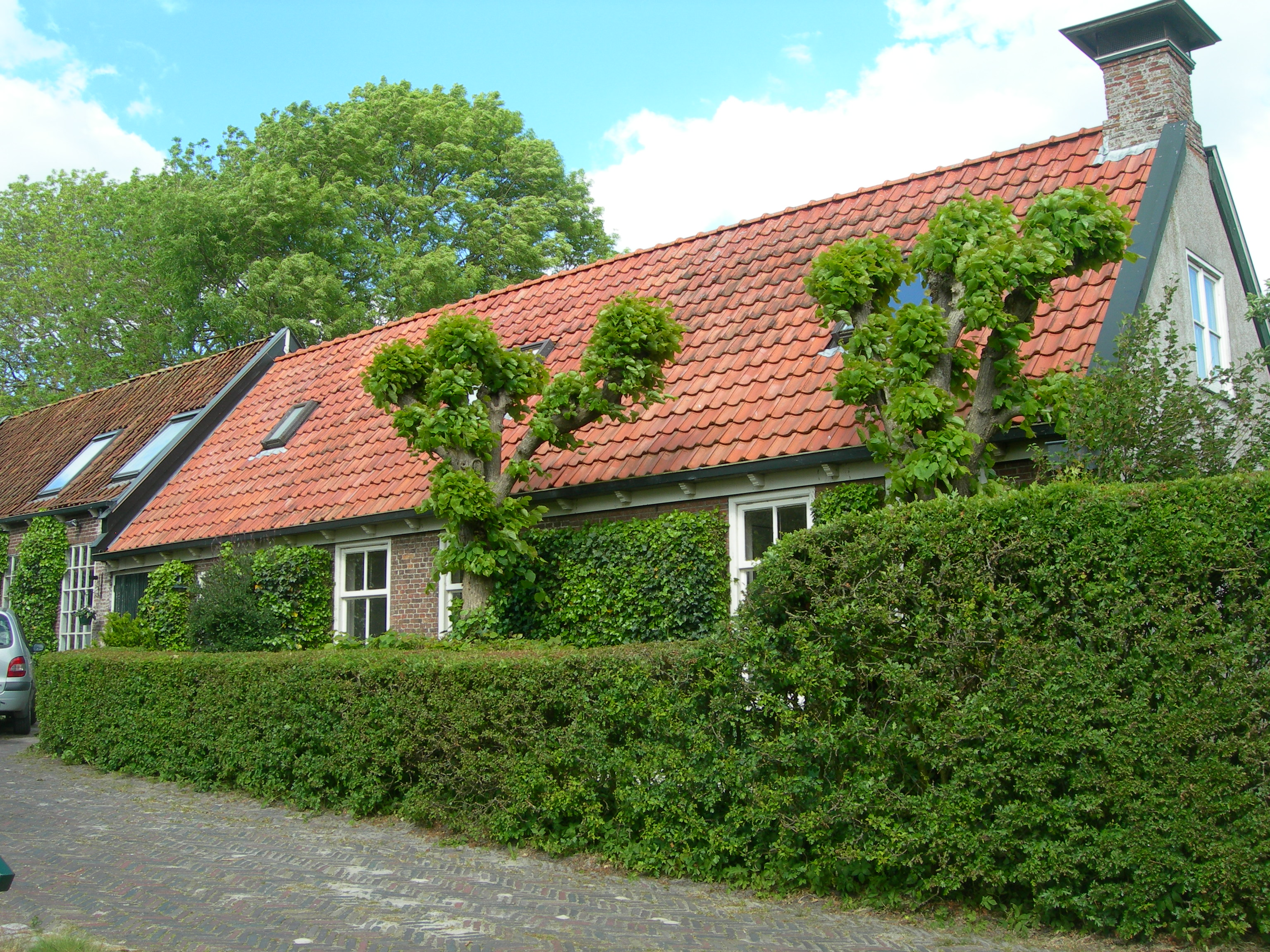
Houses in Wyns

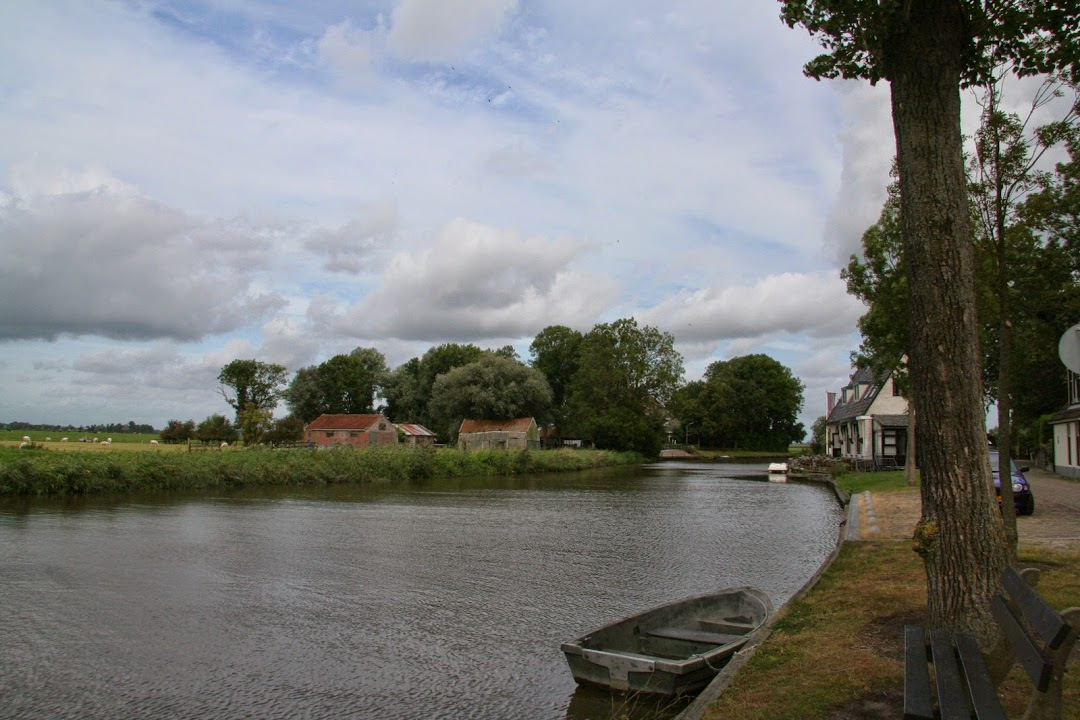
View on Wyns

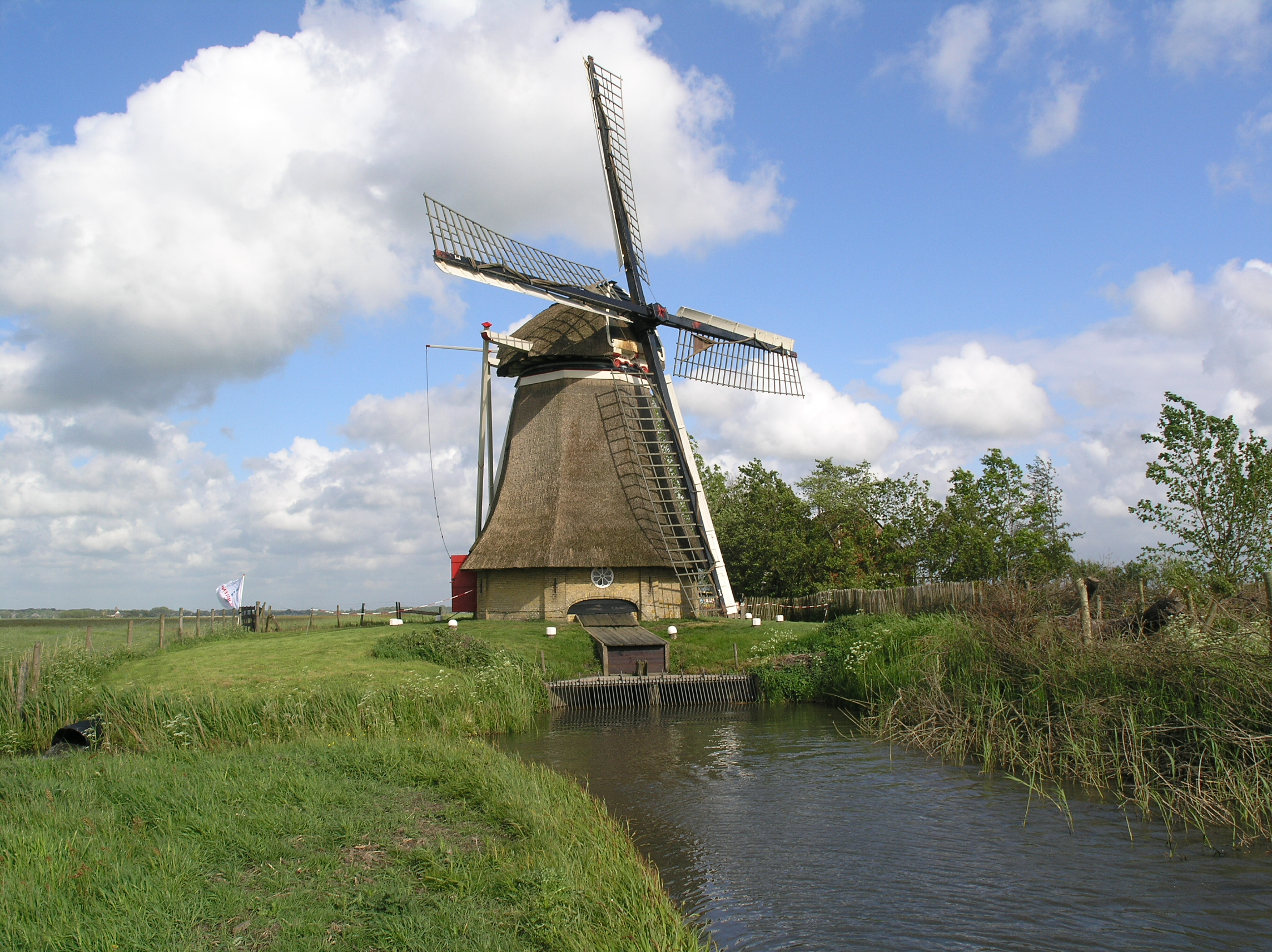
Wijnsermolen
