= Live (Saint Vitus album) =

Live album by Saint Vitus
- Released: September 1990
- Recorded: November 10, 1989
- Venue: Circus Gammelsdorf, Germany
- Genre: Doom metal
- Length: 66:45
- Label: Hellhound
- Producer: Stephan Gross

Saint Vitus chronology
V (1990)	Live (1990)	Heavier Than Thou (1991)

Professional ratings
Review scores
Source	Rating
AllMusic	4.5/5 stars
Collector's Guide to Heavy Metal	6/10
Rock Hard	8.0/10

Live is the first live album by the American doom metal band Saint Vitus, recorded on November 10, 1989, at Germany's Circus Gammelsdorf. The album was released in 1990 on Hellhound Records. It was re-released by Southern Lord Records (SUNN43) in 2005. This was the final release to feature singer Scott "Wino" Weinrich until he rejoined Saint Vitus some years later, performing on their 2012 album Lillie: F-65.

== Track listing ==
All songs written by Dave Chandler except where noted

1. "Living Backwards" – 2:31
2. "Born Too Late" (Chandler, Scott Reagers) - 7:12
3. "The War Starter" - 7:29
4. "Mind - Food" - 3:23
5. "Looking Glass" - 5:12
6. "White Stallions" - 5:52
7. "Look Behind You" - 4:16
8. "Dying Inside" - 9:00
9. "War Is Our Destiny" (Chandler, Reagers) - 4:26
10. "Mystic Lady" - 8:52
11. "Clear Windowpane" - 8:32

== Personnel ==
Saint Vitus

- Scott "Wino" Weinrich - vocals
- Dave Chandler - guitar
- Mark Adams - bass
- Armando Acosta - drums

Production

- Stephan Gross - producer, engineer
- Frits Veenstra - live sound engineer
