= Punctuated Equilibrium (album) =

Studio album by Wino (Scott Weinrich)
- Released: January 26, 2009
- Recorded: The Magpie Cage, 2008
- Genre: Doom metal, stoner metal
- Length: 42:24
- Label: Southern Lord
- Producer: J. Robbins, Wino

Professional ratings
Review scores
Source	Rating
AllMusic	3.5/5 stars
Kerrang!	4/5 stars

Punctuated Equilibrium is the first solo album by American singer/guitarist Scott "Wino" Weinrich, released in January 2009 via Southern Lord.

== Track listing ==
1. "Release Me" 5:52
2. "Punctuated Equilibrium" 2:46
3. "The Woman in the Orange Pants" 3:25
4. "Smilin Road" 5:09
5. "Eyes of the Flesh" 4:12
6. "Wild Blue Yonder" 6:25
7. "Secret Realm Devotion" 4:50
8. "Water Crane" 1:57
9. "Gods, Frauds, Neo-Cons and Demagogues" 3:12
10. "Silver Lining" 4:31

Bonus 10" vinyl tracks

1. "Chest Fever"
2. "Der Gift (The Poison)"
3. "The Comet and the Moon"
4. "On the (Sacrificial) Lam"

== Personnel ==
- Scott "Wino" Weinrich – vocals, guitar
- Steve Fisher – additional guitars
- J. Robbins – keyboards
- Jon Blank – bass guitar
- Jean-Paul Gaster – drums, percussion

Production

- Produced by Wino and J. Robbins
- Engineered by J. Robbins
- Mastered by Bob Weston
