= Sankt Veit =

Sankt Veit is the German name for Saint Vitus in place names (cf. wiktionary:Sankt).

Places named Sankt Veit in Austria include:

- Sankt Veit an der Glan, Carinthia
  - Sankt Veit an der Glan (district), Carinthia
- Sankt Veit an der Gölsen, Lower Austria
- Sankt Veit im Pongau, Salzburg
- Sankt Veit am Vogau, Styria
- Sankt Veit in Defereggen, Tyrol
- Sankt Veit im Innkreis, Upper Austria
- Sankt Veit im Mühlkreis, Upper Austria
- Sankt Veit in der Gegend, Styria
- The Ober Sankt Veit and Unter Sankt Veit (now part of Hietzing) neighborhoods in Vienna, formerly known as Sankt Veit an der Wien.

Other places named Sankt Veit include:

- Neumarkt-Sankt Veit, Bavaria, Germany
- St. Vith (Sankt Veit in German), Liège, Belgium
- Canton of Sankt-Vith (Sankt Veit in German), Belgium; part of Eupen Sankt Vith
- Sankt Veit am Flaum, Kvarner, Croatia

== See also ==
- St. Vitus's Church, for churches named Sankt Veit
