= St. Vitus's Church =

St. Vitus's Church, or similar, may refer to:

- Church of St. Vitus (Chicago), Illinois, United States
- St. Vitus's Church, Cleveland, Ohio, United States
- St. Vitus Church (Český Krumlov), Czech Republic
- St. Vitus Cathedral, Prague, Czech Republic
- St. Vitus Cathedral in Rijeka, Croatia
- Church of St. Vitus the Martyr, Zagreb, Croatia
- St. Vitus's Parish Church, Šentvid pri Planini, Šentjur, Slovenia
- Basilica of St. Vitus, Mönchengladbach, Germany
- St. Vitus' Abbey on the Rott, Neumarkt-Sankt Veit, Mühldorf, Bavaria, Germany.
- St. Vitus church, Gärtringen, Germany
- Protestant church of Wyns, Wyns, Netherlands
