= Place of Skulls (band) =

American doom metal band

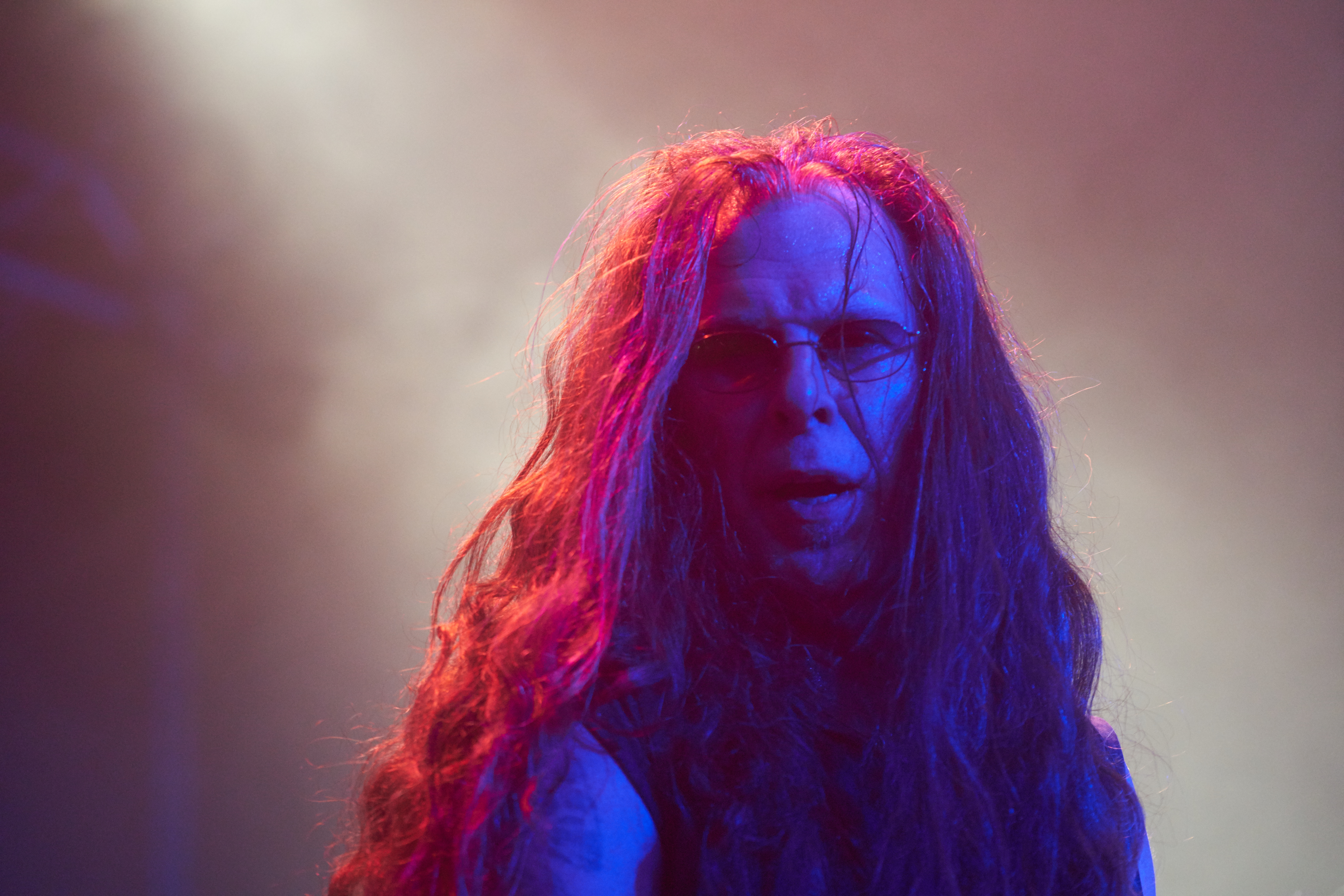
- Frontman Victor Griffin, the sole constant member of the band

Background information
- Origin: Knoxville, Tennessee, U.S.
- Genres: Doom metal
- Years active: 2000–present
- Labels: Exile on Mainstream, Southern Lord, Outlaw
- Members: Victor Griffin; Lee Abney; Tim Tomaselli
- Past members: Scott "Wino" Weinrich; Dennis Cornelius; Greg Turley; Ron Holzner "Minnesota" Pete Campbell

Place of Skulls is an American doom metal band from Knoxville, Tennessee.

== History ==
Place of Skulls was formed in 2000 by ex-Pentagram guitarist Victor Griffin. Griffin left Pentagram in 1996 and during this time before starting the band, became a Christian. The name is a biblical reference to Golgotha. The band put out their debut album, Nailed, via Southern Lord Records in 2002. Many of these songs deal with Griffin's new found faith in Christianity. Four songs from the Nailed session were explicitly Christian and for this reason did not appear on the album. These were released as the Love Through Blood EP in 2005.

Scott "Wino" Weinrich joined the band for their second album, With Vision. The album was released by Southern Lord Records in 2003. Shortly after, Wino left the band to concentrate on The Hidden Hand.

In 2006 the band signed to Germany's Exile on Mainstream Records and released the album The Black Is Never Far. In 2010, the band released their fourth album, As a Dog Returns.

On June 17, 2016, Place of Skulls re-released their whole discography digitally through Stone Groove Records They are also frequently featured on the label's weekly radio show Stone Grooves & Deep Cuts.

== Members ==
Current

- Victor Griffin – vocals, guitar (2000–present)
- Lee Abney – bass (2000–2002, 2007–present)
- "Minnesota" Pete Campbell – drums (2004–2005, 2011–2014, 2016–present)

Former members

- Tim Tomaselli – drums (2000–2004, 2005–2011, 2014–2016)
- Greg Turley – bass (2002)
- Ron Holzner – bass (2002–2003)
- Dennis Cornelius – bass, vocals (2003–2007)
- Scott "Wino" Weinrich – vocals, guitar (2003–2004)

Live musicians

- Russell Lee Padgett – drums (2016)
- Dan Lively – bass (2016)

Timeline

== Discography ==
Studio albums

- Nailed (Southern Lord Records 2001)
- With Vision (Southern Lord Records 2003)
- The Black Is Never Far (Exile on Mainstream Records 2006)
- As a Dog Returns (Giddy Up! Records 2010)
- In-Graved (Stone Groove Records 2016)

EPs

- Place of Skulls (Southern Lord Records 2002)
- Love Through Blood (Outlaw Recordings 2005)
