= Protestant church of Wyns =

Church in Wyns, Netherlands

Protestant church of Wyns Saint Vitus church
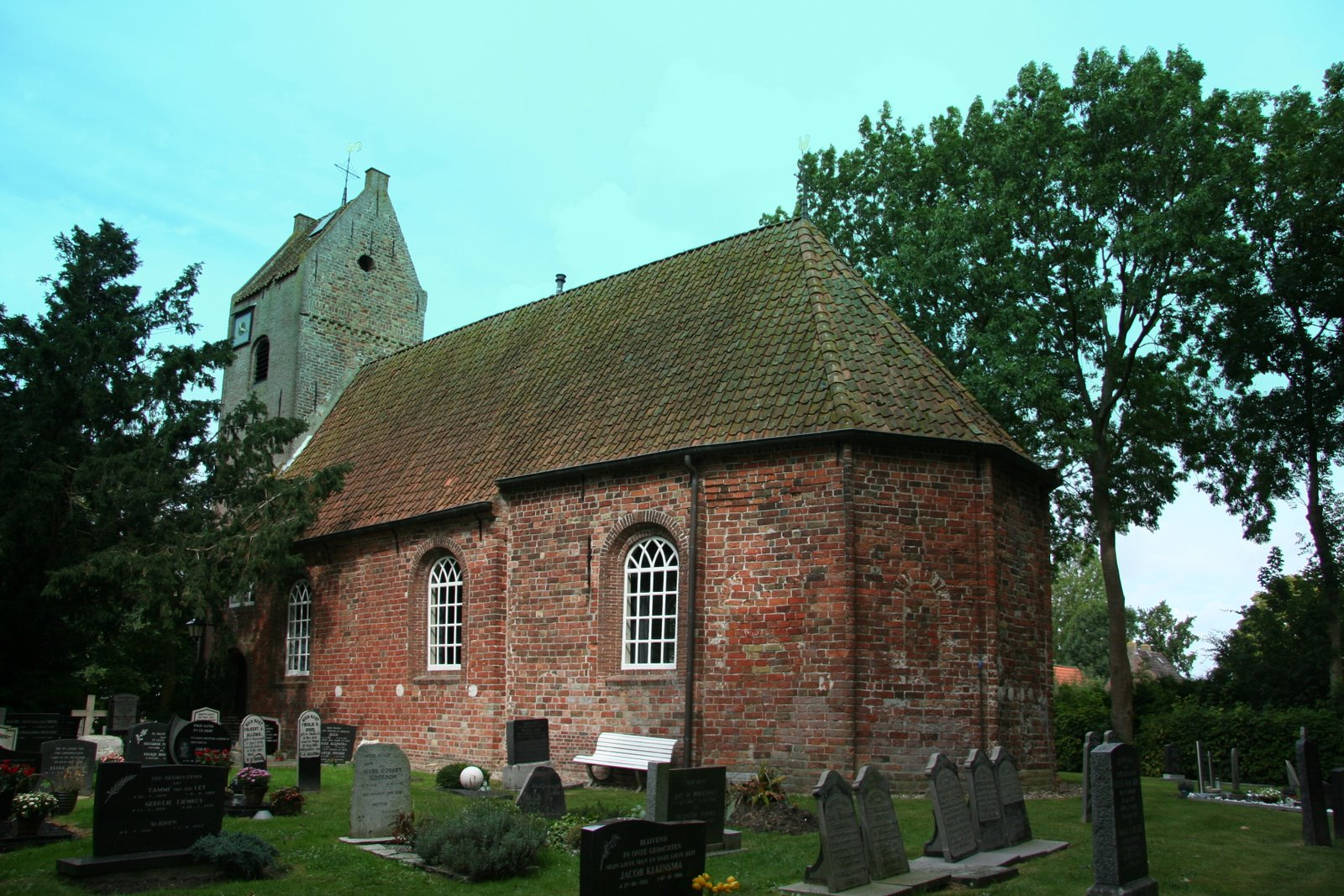
- Church of Wyns
- Protestant church of Wyns; Saint Vitus church
- 53.2517°N 5.8323°E

History
- Dedication: before the reformation to Saint Vitus

Specifications
- Materials: Brick

The Protestant church of Wyns or Saint Vitus Church is a religious building in Wyns, Netherlands, one of the medieval churches in Friesland. The nave and quintuple closed choir date from c. 1200 and are built out of red brick. The building has a tower that dates from the 13th century and a pipe organ that was built in 1899 by Bakker & Timmenga from Leeuwarden.

The church is located on the Wijns 31 and was once a Roman Catholic church dedicated to Saint Vitus but became a Protestant church after the Protestant Reformation. It is listed as a Rijksmonument, number 35690, and is rated with a very high historical value.
