= Church of St. Vitus the Martyr, Zagreb =

Church of St. Vitus the Martyr (Croatian: Župna crkva sv. Vida Mučenika)
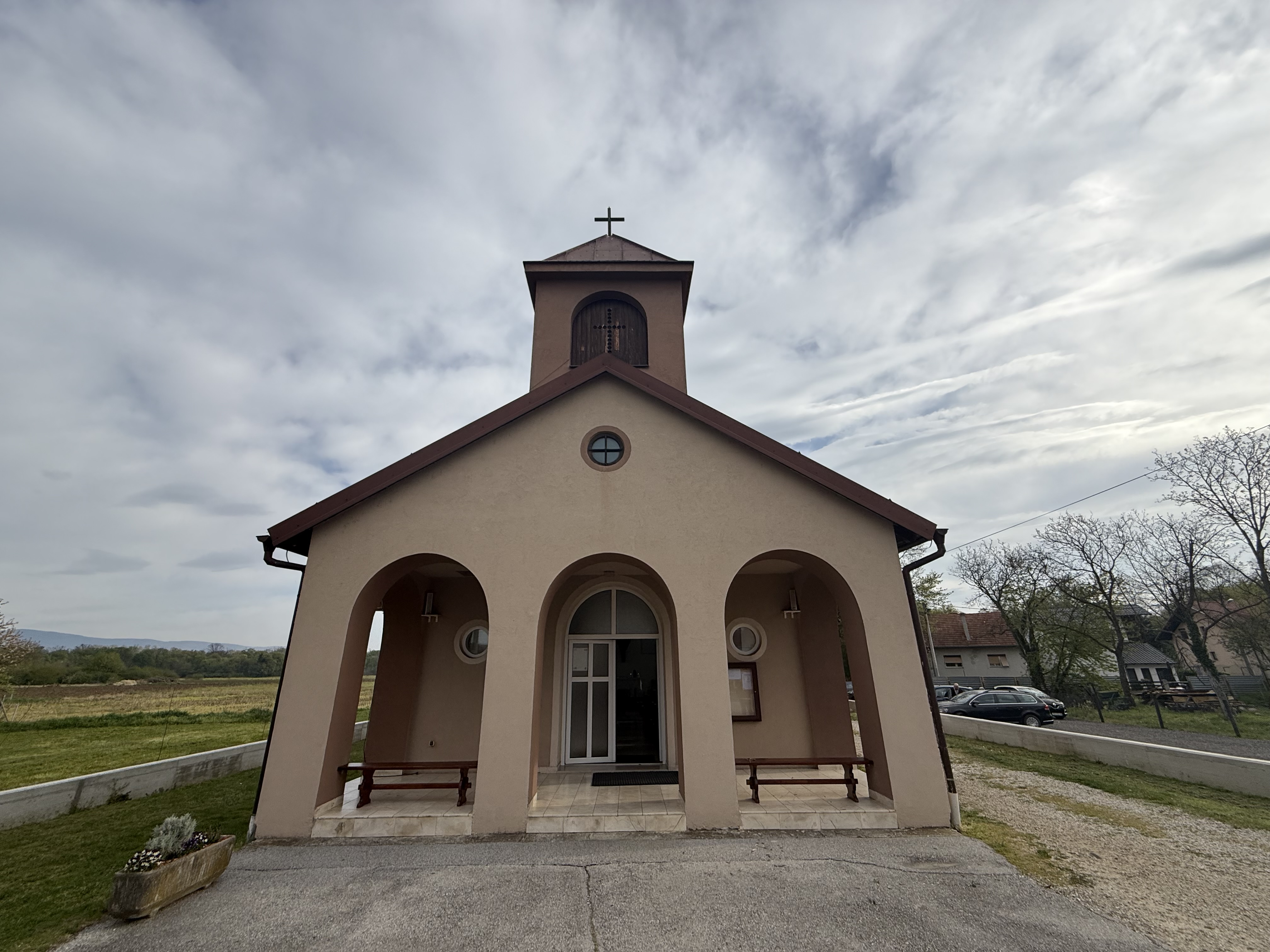
- View of the church
- Church of St. Vitus the Martyr (Croatian: Župna crkva sv. Vida Mučenika)
- 45°46′24″N 16°03′07″E
- Location: Zagreb
- Country: Croatia
- Denomination: Roman Catholic

Architecture
- Functional status: Active
- Architect: Marijan Turkulin
- Completed: 1990

Church of St. Vitus the Martyr, Zagreb (Croatian: Župna crkva sv. Vida Mučenika u Petruševcu) is a Catholic parish church located in the neighbourhood Petruševec of Zagreb, Croatia.

== History ==
It was built in 1990 and renovated externally in 2017.

== Architecture ==
The church was built according to a project by architect Marijan Turkulin from 1990. It is located in an area of the city characterised by the rare construction of family houses. Due to its design, this hidden object is not an element of the wider city views. In front of the church, an access square of weak public character with landscaping has been formed.

The church is a small liturgical building, and is entered through an entrance porch. The interior space is oriented longitudinally towards the presbytery, which is located at the end of the space. The sanctuary is elevated in relation to the space for the faithful. In the center of the presbytery is the altar, on the left is the ambo, and to the right of the altar is the tabernacle. Above the entrance to the church is the choir with a choir. The Stations of the Cross are arranged along the side walls of the space for the faithful.

== Gallery ==
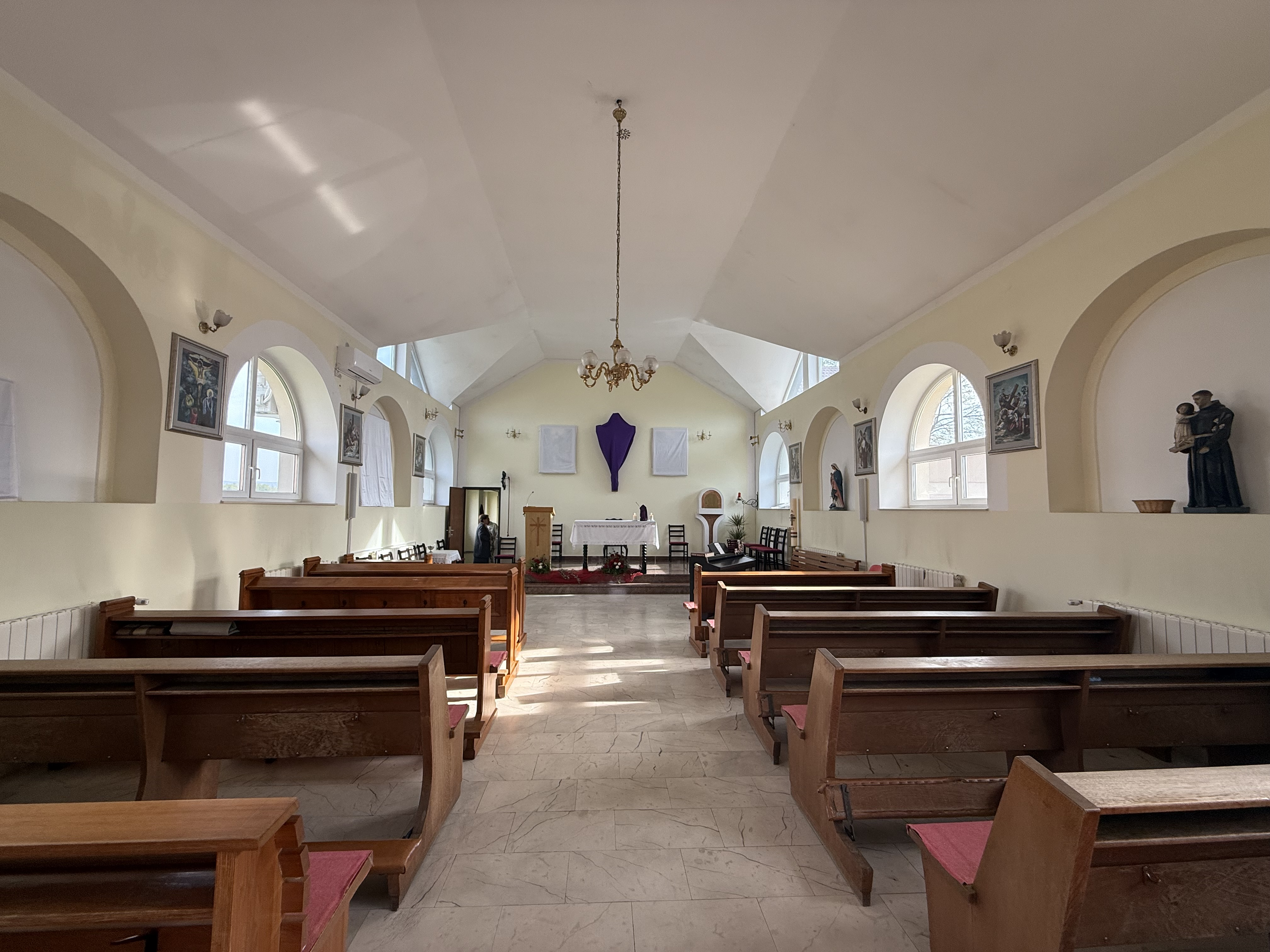
View of the sanctuary from the church entrance

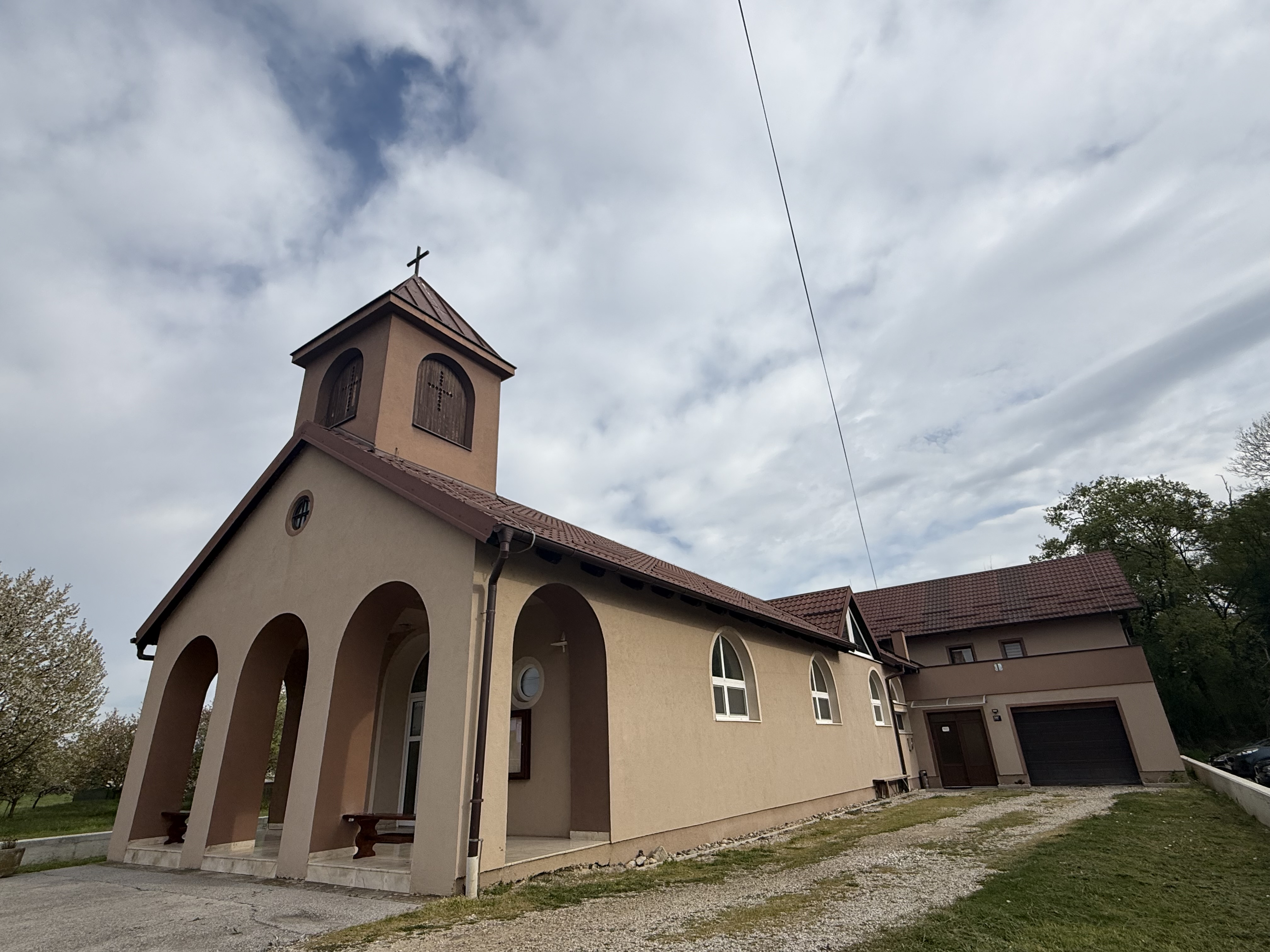
Side facade of the church

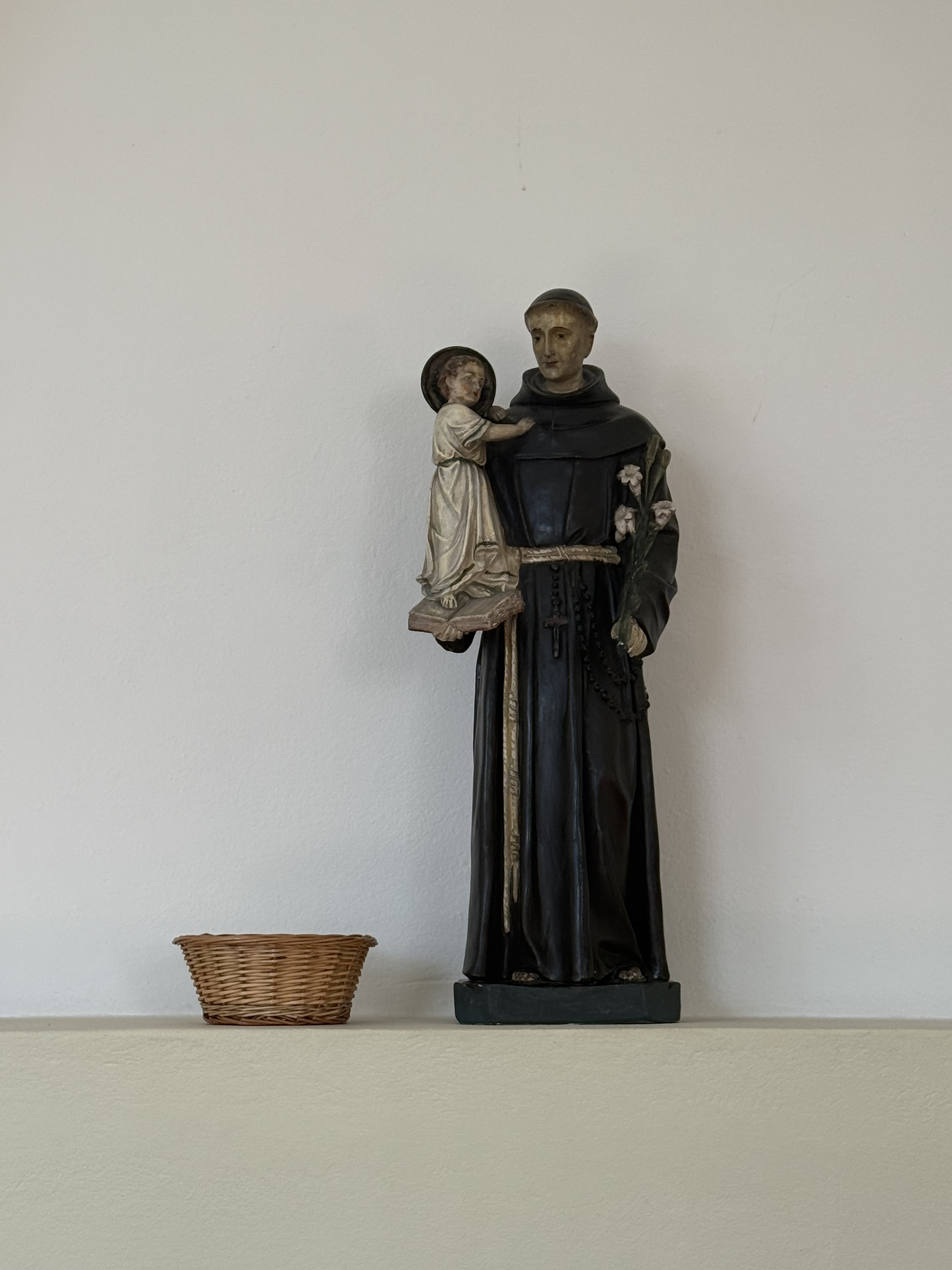
Sculpture inside the church

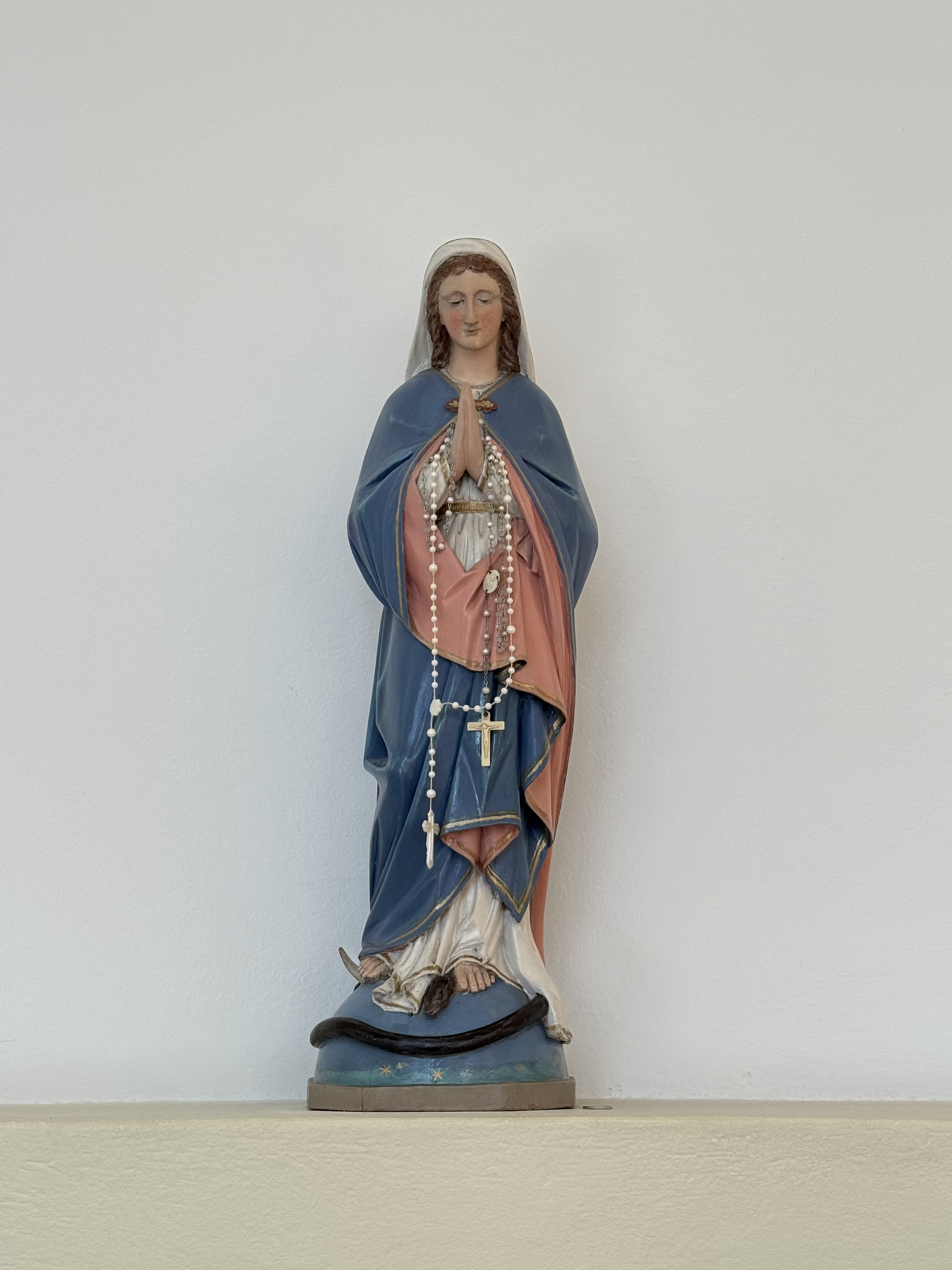
Sculpture inside the church
