= C.O.D. (album) =

Studio album by Saint Vitus
- Released: September 1992
- Recorded: February–March 1992
- Studio: 710 Studios, Redondo Beach, California
- Genre: Doom metal
- Length: 62:21
- Label: Hellhound
- Producer: Don Dokken & Saint Vitus

Saint Vitus chronology
Heavier Than Thou (1991)	C.O.D. (1992)	Die Healing (1995)

Professional ratings
Review scores
Source	Rating
AllMusic	1.5/5 stars
Collector's Guide to Heavy Metal	6/10
Exclaim!	8/10
Rock Hard	8.5/10

C.O.D. (also known as Children of Doom) is the sixth studio album by the American doom metal band Saint Vitus. The album was released in 1992 on Hellhound Records. This is the only album to feature former Count Raven vocalist Christian Linderson. The band had a break after this album, but reformed with original singer Scott Reagers for their next album, Die Healing (1995).

== Track listing ==
All songs written by Dave Chandler, except "Planet of Judgement" by Saint Vitus (lyrics by Armando Acosta and Christian Linderson), and "Imagination Man" by Mark Adams, Chandler and Acosta (lyrics by Chandler).

1. "Intro" - 1:47
2. "Children of Doom" - 6:07
3. "Planet of Judgement" - 7:39
4. "Shadow of a Skeleton" - 5:55
5. "(I Am) The Screaming Banshee" - 3:48
6. "Plague of Man" - 8:01
7. "Imagination Man" - 4:25
8. "Fear" - 4:58
9. "Get Away" - 7:23
10. "Bela" - 5:58
11. "A Timeless Tale" - 2:17
12. "Hallow's Victim (Exhumed)" - 4:03

== Personnel ==
Saint Vitus

- Christian Linderson - vocals
- Dave Chandler - guitar, vocals and keyboards on "A Timeless Tale"
- Mark Adams - bass
- Armando Acosta - drums

Additional musicians

- Mimi Anderson - backing vocals on "A Timeless Tale"

Production

- Don Dokken - producer
- Ulf Henriksen - engineer
