= Nailed (Place of Skulls album) =

Studio album by Place of Skulls
- Released: September 18, 2001
- Genre: Doom metal
- Length: 39:02
- Label: Southern Lord
- Producer: Travis Wyrick

Place of Skulls chronology
Nailed (2001)	With Vision (2003)

Professional ratings
Review scores
Source	Rating
AllMusic	3/5 stars

Nailed is the first studio album by Place of Skulls. The album was originally recorded under the Man's Ruin label which folded before the album could be released. Guy Pinhas (The Obsessed, Goatsnake) appealed to Greg Anderson for assistance which resulted in the band signing with Southern Lord to distribute the album.

Bassist Lee Abney left the band soon after the album's release.

== Track listing ==
All songs written by Victor Griffin, except where noted.

1. "The Fall" – 4:38
2. "Never Die" – 4:29
3. "Dead" – 5:18
4. "Don't Let Me Be Misunderstood*" (Benjamin, Caldwell, Marcus) – 4:40
5. "Feeling of Dread..." – 2:31
6. "..." – 2:20
7. "Love She Gave" – 5:12
8. "Return" – 4:34
9. "Song of Solomon" – 5:23
- Cover of a song originally written for Nina Simone, but was itself covered by The Animals

== Personnel ==
- Victor Griffin – vocals and guitar
- Lee Abney – bass
- Tim Tomaselli – drums
