= Saint Vitus (1984 album) =

Studio album by Saint Vitus
- Released: Early 1984
- Recorded: 16 and 17 August 1982
- Studio: Total Access Recording, Redondo Beach, California
- Genre: Doom metal
- Length: 35:43
- Label: SST (022)
- Producer: Dez Cadena, Joe Carducci, SPOT, Saint Vitus

Saint Vitus chronology
Saint Vitus (1984)	Hallow's Victim (1985)

Professional ratings
Review scores
Source	Rating
AllMusic	3/5 stars
Collector's Guide to Heavy Metal	7/10

Saint Vitus is the debut album by the American doom metal band Saint Vitus, released in early 1984 via SST Records. According to Dave Chandler, the album was recorded in 1982, but was delayed by nearly two years, due to a lawsuit that SST was involved in. It was originally released on vinyl only, with later cassette and CD editions; all three formats are currently difficult to find. "White Magic/Black Magic" and "Saint Vitus" are included on the compilation album Heavier Than Thou. Along with Trouble's Psalm 9, Saint Vitus is considered by many critics one of the first doom metal albums to be released.

"Burial at Sea" was later recorded by Goatsnake and released on their Trampled Under Hoof EP.

== Track listing ==
All songs written by Dave Chandler, except where noted.

Side one
No.	Title	Length
1.	"Saint Vitus"	4:49
2.	"White Magic/Black Magic"	5:27
3.	"Zombie Hunger"	7:22

Side two
No.	Title	Length
1.	"The Psychopath" (music: Mark Adams, lyrics: Chandler)	9:26
2.	"Burial at Sea"	8:39
Total length:		35:43

== Personnel ==
Saint Vitus

- Scott Reagers – vocals
- Dave Chandler – guitar, backing vocals
- Mark Adams – bass guitar, backing vocals
- Armando Acosta – drums, backing vocals

Additional musicians

- Merrill Ward, Scott Reagers, Yvonne Saxton – backing vocals

Production

- Dez Cadena – producer, backing vocals
- Joe Carducci – producer
- SPOT – producer, engineer
