= V (Saint Vitus album) =

Studio album by Saint Vitus
- Released: 1990
- Recorded: November–December 1989
- Studio: Vielkang Studio (Berlin, West Germany)
- Genre: Doom metal
- Length: 35:52
- Label: Hellhound
- Producer: Stephan Gross

Saint Vitus chronology
Mournful Cries (1988)	V (1990)	Live (1990)

Professional ratings
Review scores
Source	Rating
AllMusic	3.5/5 stars
Collector's Guide to Heavy Metal	6/10

V is the fifth studio album by American doom metal band Saint Vitus, released in 1990. Its title is a reference to the Roman numeral five, not the letter "V" from the English alphabet. The album was the band's first release not on SST Records and the last one to feature singer Scott "Wino" Weinrich (until 2012's Lillie: F-65).

In 2004, Southern Lord Records re-released the album on CD and vinyl. The reissue CD contains bonus live footage from The Palm Springs Community Center on May 16, 1986.

The track "Ice Monkey" has been covered by sludge metal band Down during their live shows. A line in "Ice Monkey" also inspired the name of Down's NOLA opener "Temptation's Wings". "Patra" was covered by The Kilimanjaro Darkjazz Ensemble in 2009.

== Track listing ==
All songs written by Dave Chandler, except where noted.

1. "Living Backwards" – 2:30
2. "I Bleed Black" – 5:10
3. "When Emotion Dies" (music: Scott Weinrich, lyrics: Chandler) – 2:00
4. "Patra (Petra)" – 7:28
5. "Ice Monkey" (Weinrich) – 4:02
6. "Jack Frost" – 7:12
7. "Angry Man" (music: Mark Adams, lyrics: Chandler) – 4:23
8. "Mind - Food" – 3:07

=== Bonus live footage ===
1. "Saint Vitus"
2. "Prayer for the (M)Asses"
3. "Clear Windowpane"
4. "Zombie Hunger"
5. "White Stallions"

== Personnel ==
Saint Vitus

- Scott "Wino" Weinrich – vocals, guitar on "Ice Monkey"
- Dave Chandler – guitar, vocals on "When Emotion Dies"
- Mark Adams – bass
- Armando Acosta – drums

Additional musicians

- Fiona McMillan – vocals on "When Emotion Dies"

Production

- Stephan Gross – producer, engineer
