= Scott Weinrich =

American heavy metal musician (born 1961)

Scott "Wino" Weinrich
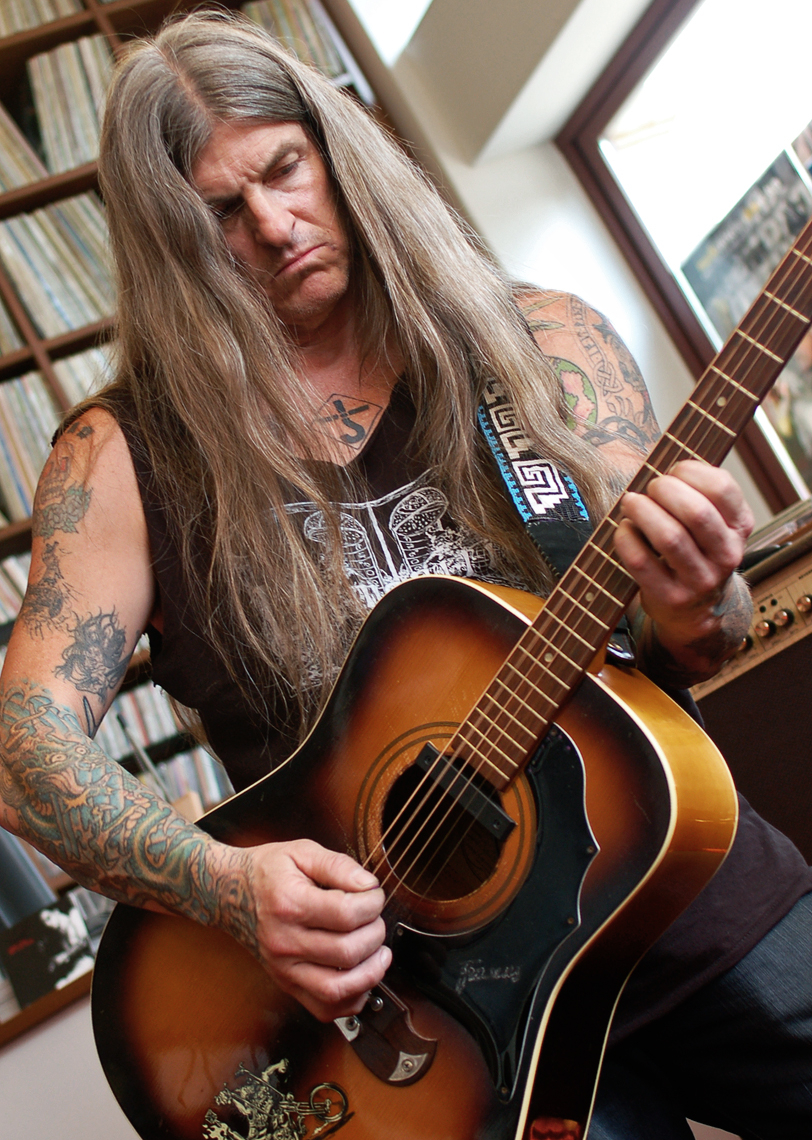
- Weinrich in 2010

Background information
- Born: Robert Scott Weinrich; September 29, 1960 (age 65); Rockville, Maryland, US
- Genres: Doom metal; stoner metal; acoustic rock
- Occupations: Musician; singer; songwriter
- Instruments: Guitar; vocals
- Years active: 1976–present
- Member of: The Obsessed
- Formerly of: Spirit Caravan; Saint Vitus; Shrinebuilder; The Hidden Hand; Premonition 13; Place of Skulls; Warhorse; Lost Breed; Royale Daemons
- Website: scottweinrich.com

Robert Scott Weinrich (born 1961), better known as Wino, is an American singer and guitarist. He has been highly influential in helping develop and codify doom metal's trademark sound, and is also considered an influential figure in the stoner rock and punk rock genre.

Weinrich started his first band Warhorse in 1976, which would later become The Obsessed. In 1986 he joined doom metal band Saint Vitus, where he performed on four studio albums, including their most iconic effort Born Too Late. He has also released three solo albums since 2009.

== Biography ==
=== Early years ===
Weinrich appreciated rock music at an early age. His early influences were the Monkees and the Beatles (the latter inspired him to play guitar), and later Frank Zappa, Jimi Hendrix and Black Sabbath. He saw Black Sabbath during the Paranoid tour and described the gig as life-changing. He also cited punk bands like the Stooges, the Dictators and the Saints as big influences.

=== Early career ===
Weinrich's musical career began at Thomas Sprigg Wootton High School in Rockville, Maryland, when he started his first band Warhorse—the band that would become the Obsessed in the late 1970s. This version of the Obsessed would release a 7" titled Sodden Jackal in 1983 on Invictus Records and have a track featured on Metal Blade Records's Metal Massacre VI. They also recorded an album titled Live at the Wax Museum in 1982. In the mid-1980s, Weinrich disbanded the Obsessed and moved to California to sing for Saint Vitus. During this time, he also briefly played bass anonymously for the Mentors and filled in on vocals for Los Angeles hard rock band Lost Breed.

In Saint Vitus, Weinrich covered vocal duties as well as additional guitar work on some tracks. The band released three studio albums with Weinrich: Born Too Late (1986), Mournful Cries (1988) and V (1990), the live album Live (1990), and the Thirsty and Miserable EP (1987). After Saint Vitus signed to Hellhound Records, Hellhound put out The Obsessed (1990), a collection of archived Obsessed recordings. This prompted Weinrich to leave Saint Vitus and reform the Obsessed (in between a stint with Maryland's Lost Breed), who now had a record deal with Hellhound Records.

=== Mid-career ===
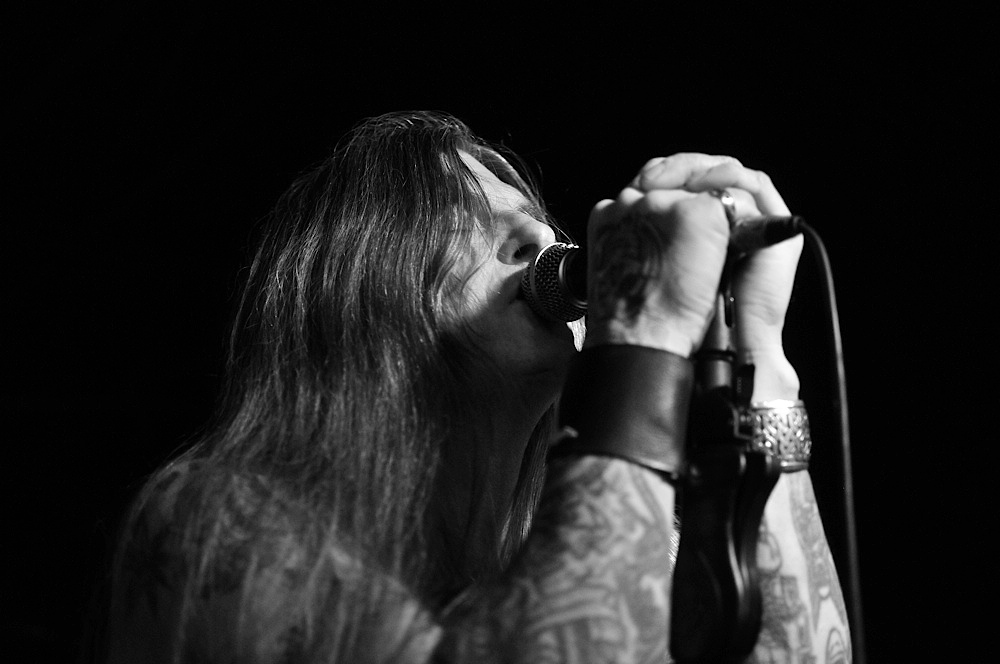
Weinrich performing with Saint Vitus in 2011

This incarnation of the Obsessed released some 7"s and two more albums, Lunar Womb (1991) and The Church Within (1994) (the latter was picked up by Columbia Records), before calling it quits in 1994. They also released a documentary video that year, featuring several musicians of the punk and metal scenes such as Henry Rollins, Ian MacKaye, Phil Anselmo, Pepper Keenan, Jennifer Finch, Dale Crover and Lee Dorrian. Weinrich then formed Shine which released a single 7" with two songs. The band later became Spirit Caravan with ex-Wretched (another Hellhound act) vocalist Dave Sherman on bass. Spirit Caravan put out two albums, Jug Fulla Sun (1999) and Elusive Truth (2001), and the Dreamwheel EP (1999), before disbanding in 2002. Weinrich joined ex-Pentagram guitarist Victor Griffin in his band Place of Skulls for one album, With Vision (2003), before leaving to start his most recent band, the Hidden Hand. The Hidden Hand released a 7", three studio albums, one DVD/CDEP, and a split 12" with Wooly Mammoth before Weinrich disbanded the group in August 2007.

Weinrich was a member of a project called Shrinebuilder featuring Al Cisneros (Om and Sleep), Scott Kelly of Neurosis, and Dale Crover (Melvins and Altamont), and recorded an album of solo material titled Punctuated Equilibrium featuring Jean-Paul Gaster of Clutch (drums) and Jon Blank of Rezin (bass guitar), which was released in January 2009 on Southern Lord Records.

Weinrich contributed vocals and guitars on the track "The Emerald Law" for Dave Grohl's project Probot. He can be seen playing guitar in the Probot video for "Shake Your Blood", which features Lemmy on bass and vocals. He has also collaborated with ex-Death SS guitarist Paul Chain for some of his solo work. Weinrich was also the frontman for Lost Breed for a short time. A collection of recordings of this line-up has since been released, titled "Wino Daze".

Weinrich worked with Black Sabbath bassist Geezer Butler, Black Sabbath drummer Bill Ward, Fight guitarist Brian Tilse, and Judas Priest vocalist Rob Halford in the band Bullring Brummies, who are featured on the Nativity in Black tribute album. He also played guitar on a demo for the band "Gypsy Moth" and can be found singing and playing on the Mystick Krewe of Clearlight split CD with Acid King. Both the Obsessed and Spirit Caravan have released anthology-type albums featuring rare tracks, Incarnate (1999) and The Last Embrace (2004), respectively.

=== Recent activities ===
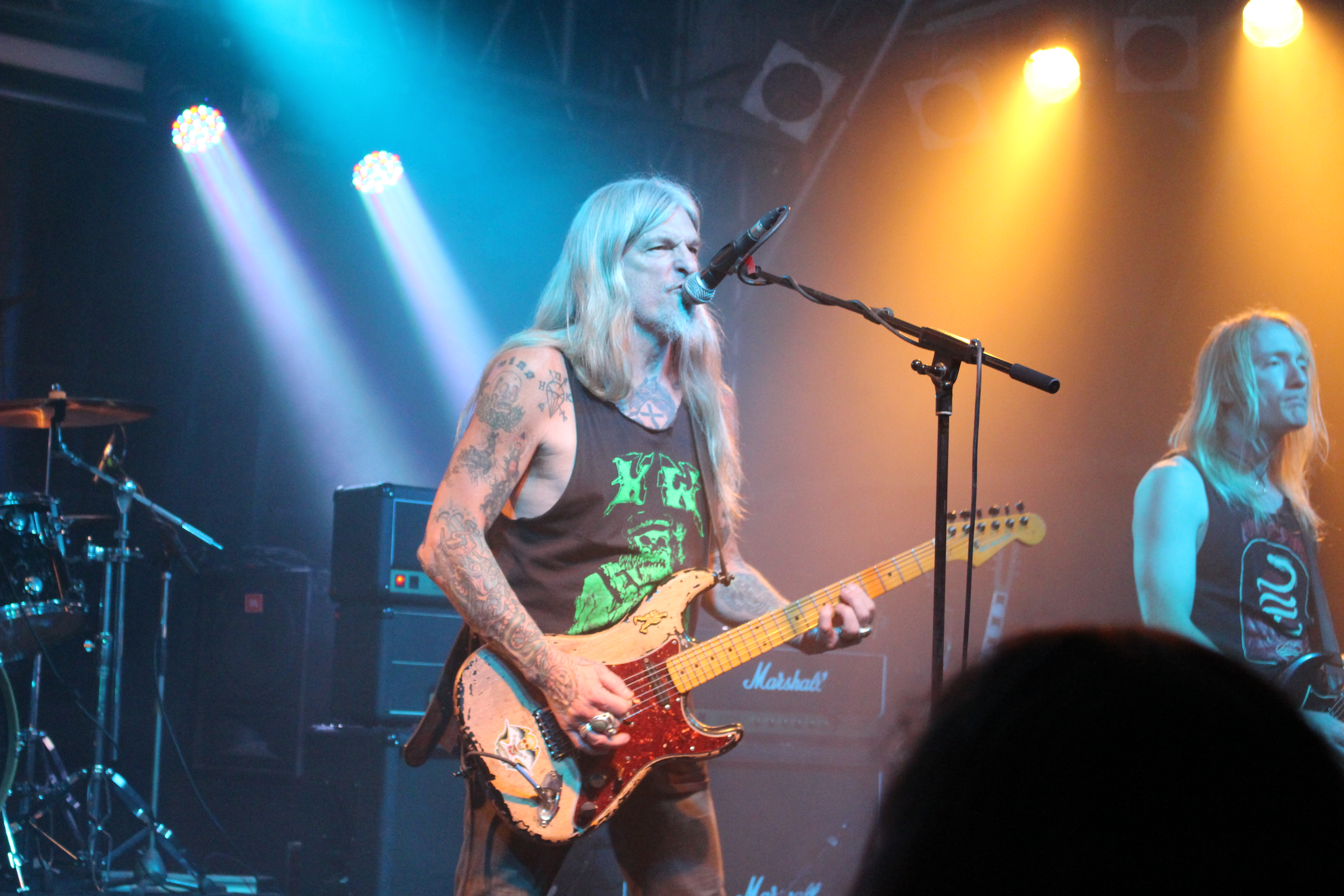
Weinrich with The Obsessed in Germany in 2023

Weinrich has been touring with the reunited Saint Vitus since 2009. It was confirmed that the band would go on to record a new album in early 2011 for a release that year. It would have been Saint Vitus's first since 1995's Die Healing and its first release with Weinrich since 1990's V. However, this plan fell through, but the band planned to regroup to make the album sometime in summer 2011 after the band's tour with Helmet and Crowbar.

Weinrich also formed Premonition 13 with guitarist Jim "Sparky" Karow in 2010. Premonition 13 released their first LP in July 2011.

In a Guitar World interview, Weinrich stated that his signature sound comes from a Gibson Les Paul guitar with DiMarzio Super Distortion pickups plugged into a Sunn model T amp. He also changes the preamp and power amp tubes of his amps with EH and JJ ones because "it's like a fuzz box built into the amp".

Weinrich released his first solo album via Southern Lord Records under the name Punctuated Equilibrium in 2009. From 2010 onwards, his solo material consists exclusively of acoustic material, having released two acoustic albums so far: Adrift in 2010 and Heavy Kingdom (a collaboration with Conny Ochs) in 2012. Weinrich toured Europe and North America extensively as a solo artist. In 2016, he reformed the Obsessed and released Sacred (2017) and Gilded Sorrow (2024).

== Discography ==
=== Solo ===
- Punctuated Equilibrium CD/LP+10" (Southern Lord, 2009)
- Live at Roadburn 2009 CD/LP (Roadburn Records, 2010)
- Adrift CD/LP (Exile On Mainstream Records in Europe, Volcom Entertainment in United States, 2010)
- Manifesto / The Field That Surrounds Me (Split-Single with Scott Kelly) 7" (Volcom Entertainment, 2010)
- Heavy Kingdom (with Conny Ochs) CD/LP (Exile On Mainstream Records, 2012)
- Labour of Love (With Conny Ochs) CD/12" (Southern Records – Latitudes Release, 2012)
- Songs of Townes Van Zandt (With Scott Kelly and Steve Von Till) CD/12" (Neurot Recordings, 2012)
- Freedom Conspiracy (with Conny Ochs) CD/LP (Exile On Mainstream Records, 2015)
- Forever Gone CD/LP (Ripple Music, RIPLP128, 2020)
- Create Or Die CD/LP (Ripple Music, 2025)

=== The Obsessed ===
- The Obsessed (Hellhound Records, 1990)
- Lunar Womb (Hellhound Records, 1991)
- The Church Within (Hellhound Records/Columbia Records, 1994)
- Sacred (Relapse Records, 2017)
- Gilded Sorrow (Ripple Music, 2024)

=== Saint Vitus ===
- Born Too Late (1986)
- Mournful Cries (1988)
- V (1990)
- Lillie: F-65 (2012)

=== Spirit Caravan ===
==== Albums ====
- Jug Fulla Sun CD (1999 Tolotta Records)
- Elusive Truth CD/LP (2001 Tolotta Records)

==== EPs ====
- "Lost Sun Dance" 7" (as Shine) (1998 Tolotta Records)
- Dreamwheel CDEP/10"EP (1999 MeteorCity Records)
- "Darkness and Longing" 7" split with Sixty Watt Shaman (1999 Tee Pee Records)
- "So Mortal Be" 7" (2002 Tolotta Records)

=== Place of Skulls ===
- With Vision (Southern Lord Records 2003)

=== The Hidden Hand ===
- Divine Propaganda CD/LP (MeteorCity Records/Exile On Mainstream Records(UK)/Beard of Stars Records (LP) 2003)
- Mother Teacher Destroyer CD/LP (Southern Lord Records/Exile On Mainstream Records(UK) 2004)
- The Resurrection of Whiskey Foote CD/LP (Southern Lord Records 2007/Doomentia Records (LP) 2009)

=== Shrinebuilder ===
- Shrinebuilder (Neurot Recordings, 2009)

=== Premonition 13 ===
- 13 (album), 2011

=== Guest appearances ===
- Probot – guitar & vocals on "Emerald Law" on their self-titled album, guitar on "My Tortured Soul (live)" on MTV2 Headbangers Ball, Vol. 2, and guitar in the video for "Shake Your Blood"
- Solace – guitar & vocals on "Common Cause" on their album 13
- The Mystick Krewe of Clearlight – vocals & E-Bow on The Father, the Son and the Holy Smoke (split CD with Acid King)
- Paul Chain – vocals on "Bloodwing" and "Nibiru Dawn" on Unreleased Vol. 2
- Bullring Brummies – guitar on "The Wizard" on Nativity in Black
- Wooly Mammoth – guitar on "Mammoth Bones" on The Temporary Nature
- Sixty Watt Shaman – guitar on "All Things Come to Pass" on Reason to Live
- Victor Griffin – backing vocals on "Late for an Early Grave", guitar & backing vocals on "The Pusher/Iron Horse" and guitar & vocals on "Haywire" on Late for an Early Grave
- Shepherd – guitar on "Thursday" and "Saturday", vocals and guitar on "Sunday" on The Coldest Day
- Lost Breed – vocals on "Nation's Song", "False Glory", "Lost Breed", "Soul Chariot" and "Coffin Cheater" on Wino Daze EP
- Wall of Sleep – guitar on "From the Bottom of These Days" on Sun Faced Apostles
- Joe Lally – guitar on "The Resigned" and "Billiards" on There to Here
- Clutch – guitar solo on "Red Horse Rainbow" (left channel), guitars on "Brazenhead"
- Cor – guitar solo on "Sägeln" from the album Snack Platt orrer stirb (2012).
- Earthride – guitar & vocals on "Supernatural Illusion" on their album Something Wicked
- Red Mesa – guitar & vocals on "Disharmonious Unlife" on their album The Path to the Deathless
- Borracho- guitar solo on “Year of the Swine” on their album “Pound of Flesh”
