= Lillie: F-65 =

Studio album by Saint Vitus
- Released: April 27, 2012
- Recorded: 2011
- Studio: Temple Sound, Port Orchard, Washington, U.S.
- Genre: Doom metal
- Length: 33:16
- Label: Season of Mist
- Producer: Tony Reed, Saint Vitus

Saint Vitus chronology
Die Healing (1995)	Lillie: F-65 (2012)

Professional ratings
Aggregate scores
Source	Rating
Metacritic	76/100
Review scores
Source	Rating
AllMusic	3/5 stars
Jukebox:Metal	4/5 stars
Pitchfork	8/10
Rock Hard	8.5/10

Lillie: F-65 is the eighth studio album by American doom metal band Saint Vitus, released on April 27, 2012 (May 22, 2012, in the United States). This is the first Saint Vitus studio album since Die Healing (1995) and the only one to feature Scott "Wino" Weinrich on vocals in 22 years, since V (1990). It also marks their first album with Henry Vasquez on drums, and their final release with bassist Mark Adams, who left the band in 2016 due to Parkinson's disease, which he died from in 2023.

In an interview, Wino explained the album title name was in reference to a powerful downer back in the day and that Dave Chandler "really had a thing for his downers."

== Single and video ==
On March 23, 2012, a 7" single of "Blessed Night" was released (coupled with "Look Behind You", which was recorded live in December 2010 at Z7 in Pratteln, Switzerland). The single was limited to 1,000 hand-numbered copies.

On April 3, 2012, Saint Vitus released a video for the song "Let Them Fall", which was produced and directed by Michael Panduro of Siegfred Productions for SCION A/V.

== Track listing ==
All tracks are written by Dave Chandler, except where noted.

No.	Title	Writer(s)	Length
1.	"Let Them Fall"		3:52
2.	"The Bleeding Ground"		6:07
3.	"Vertigo" (instrumental)	music: Scott Weinrich	2:37
4.	"Blessed Night"	music: Chandler, Mark Adams, Henry Vasquez; lyrics: Weinrich	3:59
5.	"The Waste of Time"		5:39
6.	"Dependence"		7:36
7.	"Withdrawal" (instrumental)		3:26

== Personnel ==
Saint Vitus

- Scott "Wino" Weinrich – vocals, guitar on "Vertigo"
- Dave Chandler – guitar
- Mark Adams – bass
- Henry Vasquez – drums

Production

- Tony Reed – producer, engineer, mixing and mastering
