= Joe Carducci =

American writer, record producer and music executive

Joe Carducci is an American writer, record producer, and former A&R executive, formerly most closely associated with the influential record label SST Records.

Carducci lived for a time in Chicago before moving to Hollywood in 1976. From 1981 to 1986 he was an A&R man, record producer, and co-owner of SST Records, working with, among other bands, Minutemen, Saint Vitus, Meat Puppets, Black Flag and Saccharine Trust. He also ran his own record label, Thermidor Records, which released albums by The Birthday Party, Minutemen, Oil Tasters, Flipper, Nig Heist, SPK and Al Jourgensen's pre-Ministry band Special Affect.

He wrote lyrics for the song "Jesus & Tequila" by Minutemen (Double Nickels on the Dime, 1984) and "Chinese Firedrill" from Mike Watt's 1995 solo album Ball-Hog or Tugboat?. He now resides in Centennial, Wyoming, where he runs Redoubt Press and O&O Recordings.

Carducci wrote the screenplays for the 1998 films Rock and Roll Punk and Bullet On A Wire with Jim Sikora.

In 2007, Carducci published Enter Naomi: SST, L.A. and All That..., which contained his reflections on his time at SST Records and the life and death of former SST photographer Naomi Petersen.

== Bibliography ==
- Rock and the Pop Narcotic (1991)
- Enter Naomi: SST, L.A. and All That... (2007)
- Life Against Dementia: Essays, Reviews, Interviews 1975-2011 (2012)
- Stone Male: Requiem for the Living Picture (2016)
