= Saint Vitus (band) =

American doom metal band

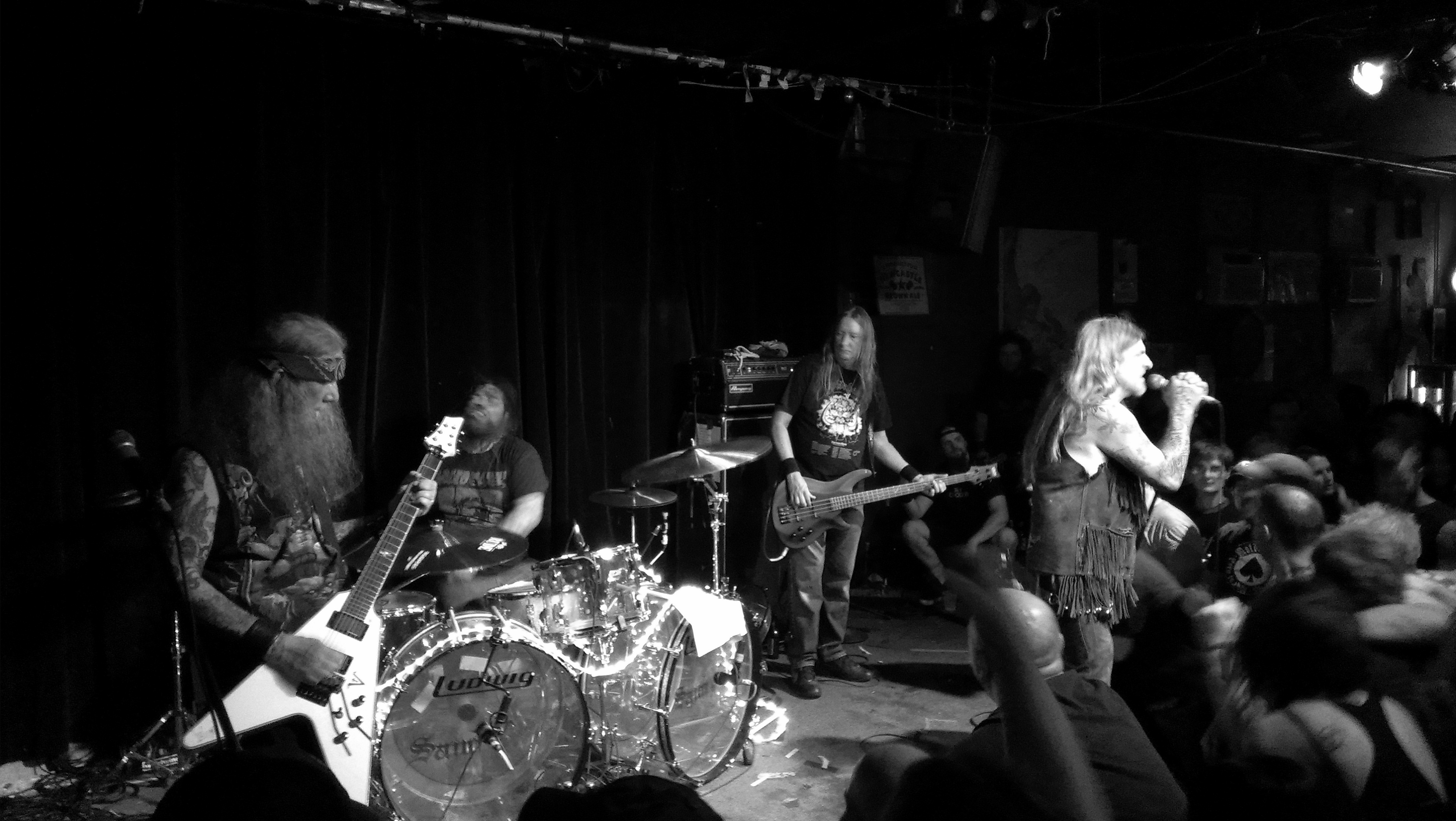
- Saint Vitus performing in Memphis, 2012. From left to right: Dave Chandler, Henry Vasquez, Mark Adams, Scott Weinrich.

Background information
- Also known as: Tyrant (1978–1980)
- Origin: Los Angeles, California, U.S.
- Genre: Doom metal
- Years active: 1978–1991; 1992–1996; 2003; 2008–present
- Labels: SST; Nuclear Blast; Roadrunner; Southern Lord; Hellhound; Season of Mist
- Members: Dave Chandler; Henry Vasquez; Scott Reagers; Pat Bruders
- Past members: Armando Acosta; Scott Weinrich; Christian Linderson; Mark Adams
- Website: saintvitusband.com

Saint Vitus is an American doom metal band formed in Los Angeles in 1978. They are considered to be one of the first doom metal bands, and have been labeled as one of the "big four" of that genre, along with Candlemass, Pentagram and Trouble. Having released nine studio albums to date, Saint Vitus have never achieved a popular breakthrough, but have exerted great influence on the development of doom metal, sludge metal, and stoner rock.

The original lineup consisted of guitarist Dave Chandler, bassist Mark Adams, drummer Armando Acosta and vocalist Scott Reagers. They recorded their first two albums before Scott Weinrich replaced Reagers in 1986. The lineup of Chandler, Adams, Acosta and Weinrich is the longest-lasting. The third album Born Too Late (1986) is generally acknowledged as their best release.

After breaking up in 1996 and briefly reforming in 2003, Saint Vitus reunited again in 2008 with the band's "classic" lineup, featuring Weinrich, Chandler, Adams and Acosta, and embarked on a successful tour. However, after 30 years in the band, Acosta left Saint Vitus in 2009 due to worsening health, and was replaced by Henry Vasquez. By 2016, both Weinrich and Adams had left Saint Vitus and were replaced by Reagers and Pat Bruders respectively, leaving Chandler as the only constant member of the band and reuniting half of the original lineup.

== History ==
=== Formation and Reagers-era (1978–1985) ===
The band was formed in 1978 under the name Tyrant, with guitarist Dave Chandler, bassist Mark Adams and drummer Armando Acosta. Vocalist Scott Reagers joined the group after the first Tyrant show, when their first singer was fired. Their main influences were Black Sabbath, Judas Priest, Blue Cheer, Blue Öyster Cult and Alice Cooper. They changed their name to Saint Vitus in 1980, after the Black Sabbath song "St. Vitus Dance".

The band's early sound combined the dark and psychedelic style of bands like Black Sabbath and Blue Cheer with the aggressive heavy metal and hardcore sound of Judas Priest and Black Flag, another favorite band of Chandler. In the beginning, their style was considered "out-of-date" compared to the hardcore punk, glam and speed metal genres, which were popular at the time. Being rejected by the Los Angeles metal community, Saint Vitus were involved in the punk rock scene. During a live performance with Overkill, Saint Vitus was discovered by Black Flag. Black Flag guitarist Greg Ginn signed them to his label, SST Records, because, according to Chandler, they were "completely opposite of what popular was in metal". Saint Vitus toured with Black Flag during the early 1980s, and later with other groups like the Brood, Saccharine Trust, the Mentors, Napalm Beach and DC3.

Chandler affirmed: "the heavy metal fans at the time hated us, and so did the punk rockers, but the punk rockers grew to appreciate us". Under this lineup, Saint Vitus recorded 2 albums (Saint Vitus & Hallow's Victim) and an EP (The Walking Dead). Reagers left the band in early 1986, and was replaced by The Obsessed frontman Scott "Wino" Weinrich (at this time, The Obsessed had only released one 7"). Reagers' final performances featured songs from then-upcoming album Born Too Late, such as "The War Starter" and "H.A.A.G", as many of these were written while he was still in the band.

=== Weinrich-era (1986–1991) ===
Because it comes from the gut. The music has that low tone and it hits you in those emotional places. I've always tried to make the lyrics just as interesting as the music. It's always been a little bit dark but I'm not drawn to the happy stuff. I like music that grabs you by the balls.

— Scott Weinrich's thoughts about the music.

Wino recorded three studio albums (Born Too Late, Mournful Cries & V), a live album (Live), and an EP (Thirsty and Miserable, featuring the Black Flag cover of the same name) with Saint Vitus. Born Too Late proved to be their most acclaimed album and the title track is considered an anthem of the doom metal genre. The Wino years marked a change in their style, featuring an even slower and darker sound, in contrast to the hardcore influences of the first two records with Reagers, and the band started to gain some notoriety in Europe.

Weinrich also wrote some songs such as "Bitter Truth", "Looking Glass" and "Ice Monkey", the latter was covered by supergroup Down in their early live performances. By 1989, Saint Vitus had been dropped from SST and signed to Hellhound Records, who released the band's next three albums. Weinrich left Saint Vitus in 1991 to reform The Obsessed after Saint Vitus' label, Hellhound Records, released an album of older Obsessed recordings.

=== Lindersson-phase, return of Reagers and breakup (1992–2002) ===
Following Weinrich's departure, the band found former Count Raven singer Christian "Chritus" Linderson as a replacement after a short search. He would record only one album, C.O.D., produced by Don Dokken, and tour Europe and America with the band until 1993 before being replaced by original vocalist Scott Reagers for what would for a long time be their final album, Die Healing, regarded by Chandler to be their finest work. Saint Vitus played dates in America and Europe following the album's release. After the completion of the tour, Saint Vitus decided to disband in 1996.

Chandler went on to form the punk/doom band Debris Inc., with Ron Holzner of Trouble in the early 2000s. They released their self-titled album via Rise Above Records in 2005. Acosta stayed busy with a band called Dirty Red, Adams no longer played music, and Reagers also left the music scene. After The Obsessed broke up in the mid-1990s, Wino moved back to Maryland and formed Shine/Spirit Caravan and once again toured Europe and the US until the band's break up in the early 2000s. His next band, The Hidden Hand, followed a similar path before breaking up in the mid-2000s. Wino also briefly joined Place of Skulls, featuring former Pentagram/Death Row guitarist Victor Griffin, for the album With Vision released in 2003.

=== Reunions, death of two original members and recent activities (2003–present) ===
On July 1, 2003, the classic Born Too Late lineup (Weinrich, Chandler, Adams, Acosta) reunited to play a gig at Double Door in Chicago.

In 2008, it was announced that Saint Vitus were reuniting again for a tour in 2009. The band headlined Friday's April 24 date at the 2009 Roadburn Festival. at the 013 venue in Tilburg, Netherlands and then went on to play three gigs in Germany. The lineup for this reunion was the same as the 2003 reunion. Drummer Armando Acosta, who had been with the band since its inception over thirty years ago, left the band before the European tour of 2009 had been completed.

Dave Chandler has cited health concerns as the reason for Armando's replacement. Armando Acosta died on November 25, 2010, from arterial complications at the age of 58, and was buried at Riverside National Cemetery in California.

He was then replaced by Henry Vasquez of the band Blood of the Sun. Wino also released one album to date as a member of the Doom Supergroup "Shrinebuilder" in 2009.

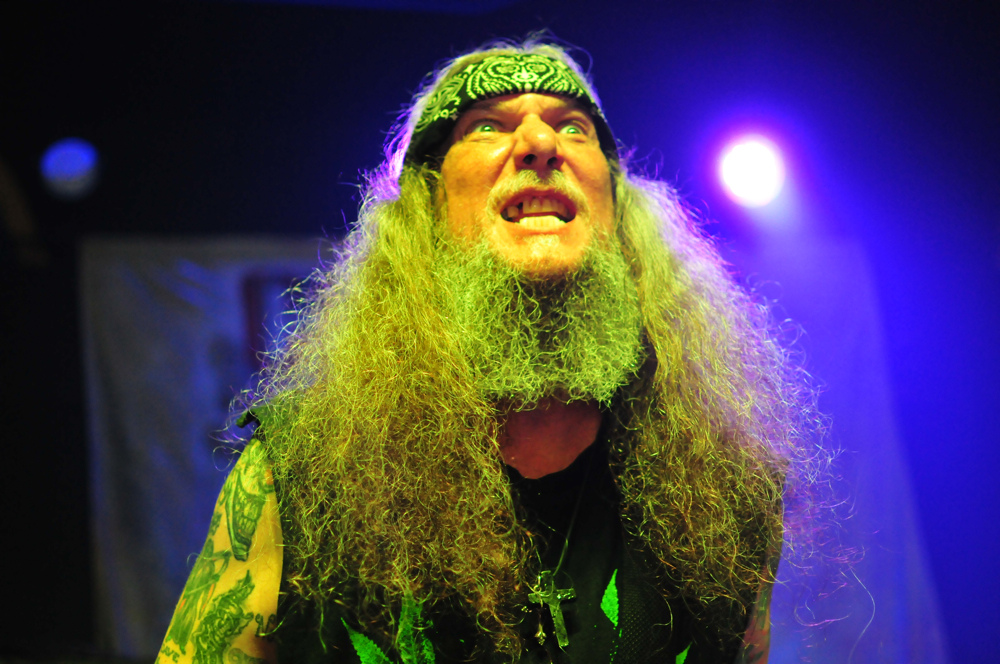
Dave Chandler performing live with Saint Vitus in Dallas, 2011

In February 2010, Chandler stated that there was talk of Saint Vitus recording new material, but there were no concrete plans at the time. However, according to frontman Weinrich, "we're writing some stuff right now. Everybody's pretty busy. I know I've been busy. The Wino band is pretty much on hiatus right now. So it looks like we'll be doing some recording in the near future. The bottom line is we would like to do a new record. There's talk about it. We've already been floating around a couple ideas. So yeah, somewhere down the line there will be a new Vitus record in the cards."

In March 2010, Wino revealed to the German edition of Metal Hammer magazine that Saint Vitus were without a record label, and had only written one new song so far, but that a full-length studio effort from the group would likely surface within the next 12 months, making a 2011 release date likely. However, plans eventually fell through, but had planned to regroup to make the album sometime in the summer of 2011, after the band finished the 2011 Metalliance Tour with Helmet and Crowbar.

On the Metalliance Tour, Saint Vitus debuted a new song called "Blessed Night". On November 8, 2010, it was announced that they were signed to Season of Mist and would release their new album, entitled Lillie: F-65, on April 27, 2012. It marked Saint Vitus' first studio album since 1995's Die Healing, its first release with vocalist Weinrich since 1990's V and first release without Armando Acosta on drums.

Late 2009 through 2010 also saw the majority of Saint Vitus' back catalog come back into print. SST Records reissued vinyl versions of all the group's records except for the first album, which was reissued on CD. The label also released Hallow's Victim and The Walking Dead on CD, having never previously been available in the format. Buried By Time and Dust Records also did a limited vinyl issue of "Die Healing" (the first time that album had been available on vinyl) with a CD reissue expected to follow.

In an April 2012 interview with Drop-D, guitarist Dave Chandler was asked if Saint Vitus was going to make another album after Lillie: F-65. His response was, "Right now we're just taking it step by step to see how people respond to [the new album]. There would be no reason not to because when you're constantly playing you get a lot of ideas. We're not going to say yes or no now. There are a lot of people talking about the record so hopefully it will live up to everybody's expectations."

Weinrich was deported to the US from Norway on November 9, 2014 after he was arrested for allegedly being caught in possession of 11 grams of methamphetamine. This occurred while the band was on tour commemorating the 35th anniversary of Born Too Late. As a result of his deportation, he missed the final six dates of the tour, which the band completed in his absence.

In 2015, Saint Vitus performed a single U.S. date in Austin, Texas and a European tour with original singer Scott Reagers, his first full shows with the band in 20 years. Due to Wino's commitments with The Obsessed's reunion, Reagers once again filled in for him on Saint Vitus' fall 2016 U.S. tour with The Skull and Witch Mountain and has remained with the band ever since. Also during this period, Pat Bruders of Crowbar and Down filled in for their longtime bassist Mark Adams, who could not tour with the band because of health reasons; it was revealed in October 2018 that he had been suffering from Parkinson's disease.

Saint Vitus released their live album Live Vol. 2 on September 23, 2016.

In a November 2017 interview, Chandler stated that they had "pretty much a whole [new] album" written.

The band's latest album, titled Saint Vitus, was released on May 17, 2019.

Mark Adams died from complications of Parkinson's disease on May 23, 2023, at the age of 64.

== Personnel ==
=== Members ===
Current members

- Dave Chandler – guitars (1978–1996, 2003, 2008–present)
- Henry Vasquez – drums, percussion (2009–present)
- Scott Reagers – vocals (1978–1986, 1994–1996, 2015–present)
- Pat Bruders – bass (2016–present)

Former members

- Armando Acosta – drums, percussion (1978–1996, 2003, 2008–2009; died 2010)
- Mark Adams – bass (1978–1996, 2003, 2008–2016; died 2023)
- Scott "Wino" Weinrich – guitars, vocals (1986–1991, 2003, 2008–2015)
- Christian Linderson – vocals (1991–1994)

== Discography ==
- Saint Vitus (1984)
- Hallow's Victim (1985)
- Born Too Late (1986)
- Mournful Cries (1988)
- V (1990)
- C.O.D. (1992)
- Die Healing (1995)
- Lillie: F-65 (2012)
- Saint Vitus (2019)
