= Die Healing =

Studio album by Saint Vitus
- Released: May 9, 1995
- Recorded: October–November 1994
- Studio: Music Lab Berlin, Berlin, Germany
- Genre: Doom metal
- Length: 49:50
- Label: Hellhound
- Producer: Harris Johns & Saint Vitus

Saint Vitus chronology
C.O.D. (1992)	Die Healing (1995)	Lillie: F-65 (2012)

Professional ratings
Review scores
Source	Rating
AllMusic	2.5/5 stars
Collector's Guide to Heavy Metal	6/10
Exclaim!	8/10
Rock Hard	9.0/10

Die Healing is the seventh studio album by the American doom metal band Saint Vitus, released in 1995 by Hellhound Records. In addition to being their final album before disbanding in 1996, Die Healing saw the band reunite with the original lineup of vocalist Scott Reagers, guitarist Dave Chandler, bassist Mark Adams and drummer Armando Acosta. It would, however, be the last Saint Vitus album to feature Acosta before his death in 2010, and Reagers for 20 years until his return to the band in 2015.

In 2010, the album was reissued on limited-edition vinyl by Buried By Time And Dust Records.

== Track listing ==
All songs written by Dave Chandler.

1. "Dark World" - 4:57
2. "One Mind" - 4:34
3. "Let the End Begin" - 7:36
4. "Trail of Pestilence" - 5:10
5. "Sloth" - 8:10
6. "Return of the Zombie" - 6:42
7. "In the Asylum" - 8:11
8. "Just Another Notch" - 4:29

== Personnel ==
Saint Vitus

- Scott Reagers - vocals
- Dave Chandler - guitar, vocals on "Just Another Notch"
- Mark Adams - bass
- Armando Acosta - drums

Production

- Harris Johns - producer, engineer
