= Rohrau =

Rohrau may refer to:

- Rohrau, Austria, a town in Lower Austria
- Rohrau (Gärtringen), a village in the municipality of Gärtringen, Baden-Württemberg

== See also ==
- Count Friedrich August von Harrach-Rohrau
