= St. Vitus church (Gärtringen) =

Church in Baden-Württemberg, Germany

Coordinates: 48°38′30.4″N 08°53′53.5″E

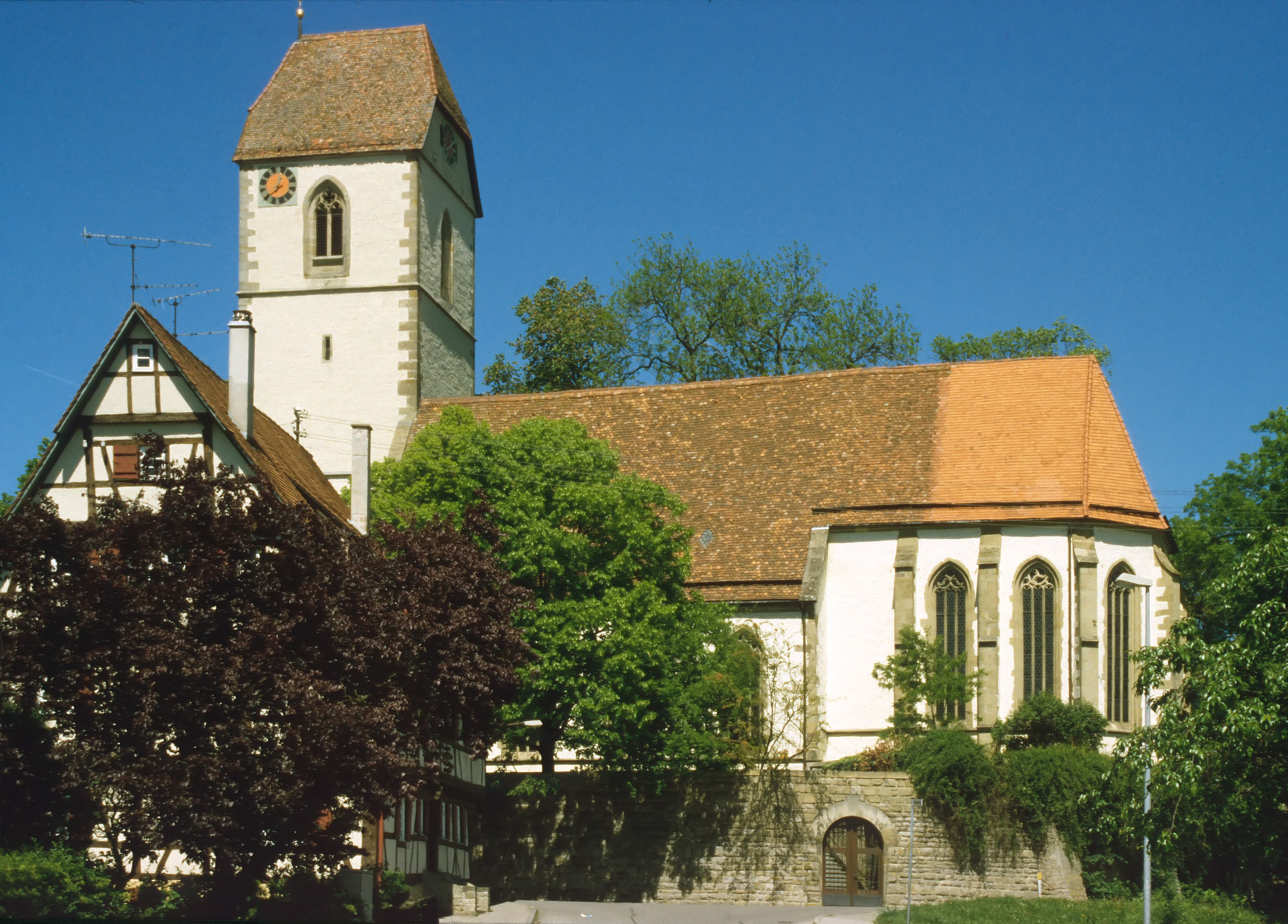
South side of St. Vitus church

The Protestant St. Vitus church in Gärtringen is considered one of the best-preserved late Gothic village churches in Württemberg. The oldest surviving component is the tower, which was built between 1455 and 1460. With its height of 38.5 meters, which can be attributed to its former use as a fortified and watchtower, it still represents the dominant landmark of the village. The year 1496, when the choir was completed, is considered the year of construction of the pilaster church.

The continuously vaulted village church has unusually rich late Gothic vault paintings and is classified as a monument of special importance. The interior of the church, which is in need of renovation, was extensively restored from May 2009 to September 2010.

== History ==
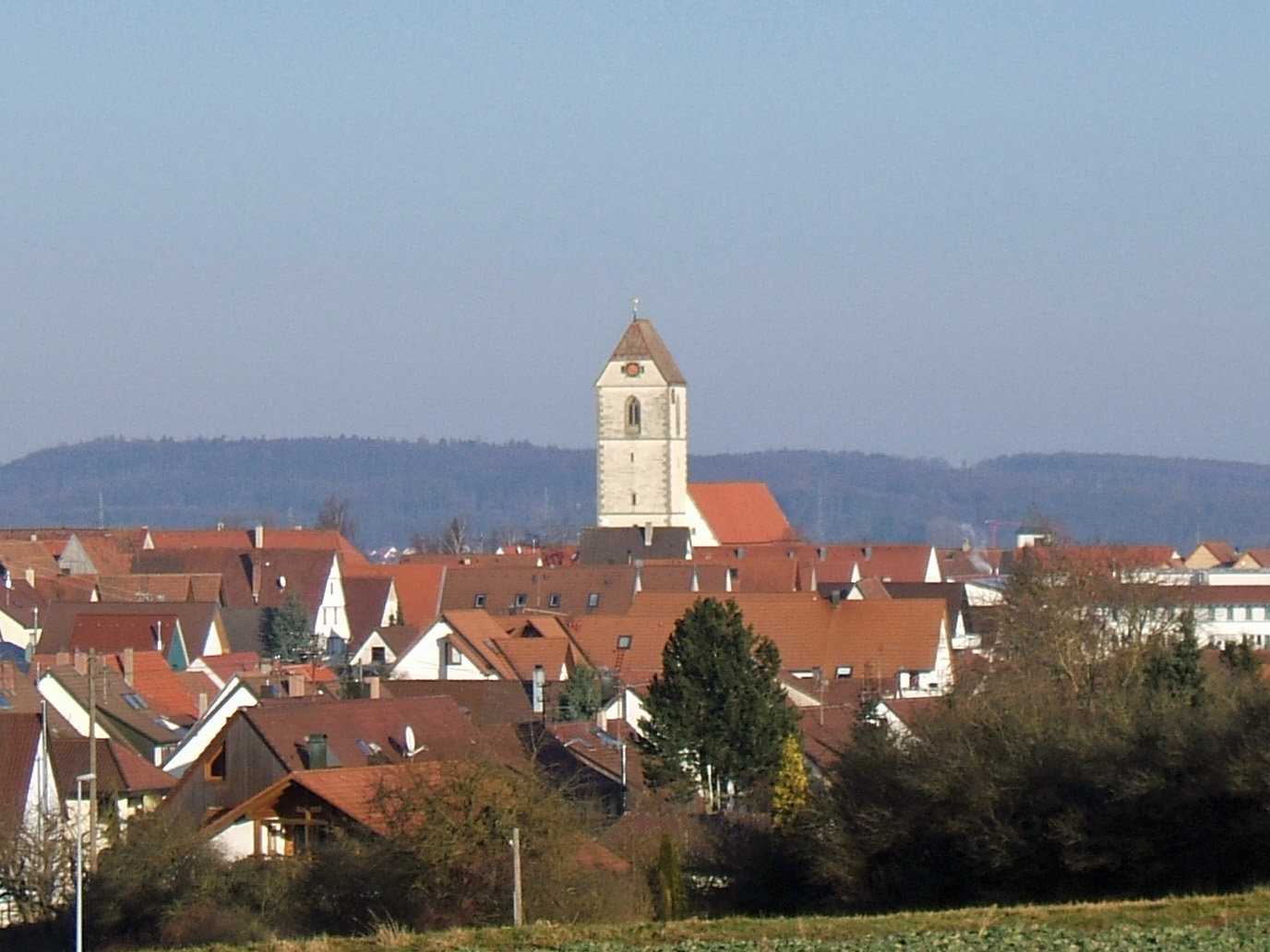
Gärtringen from southwest

=== History of the construction ===
The Liber decimationis from 1275 mentions the predecessor building of the present church for the first time. Little is known about the dimensions of the predecessor building, because no remains have been preserved above ground and there have been no excavations in the area of the church. There is a hint of the previous nave on the tower wall in the nave's roof truss. There the old gable line can be seen, from which it can be concluded that the earlier nave was shallower and 4.5 meters lower than the present one.

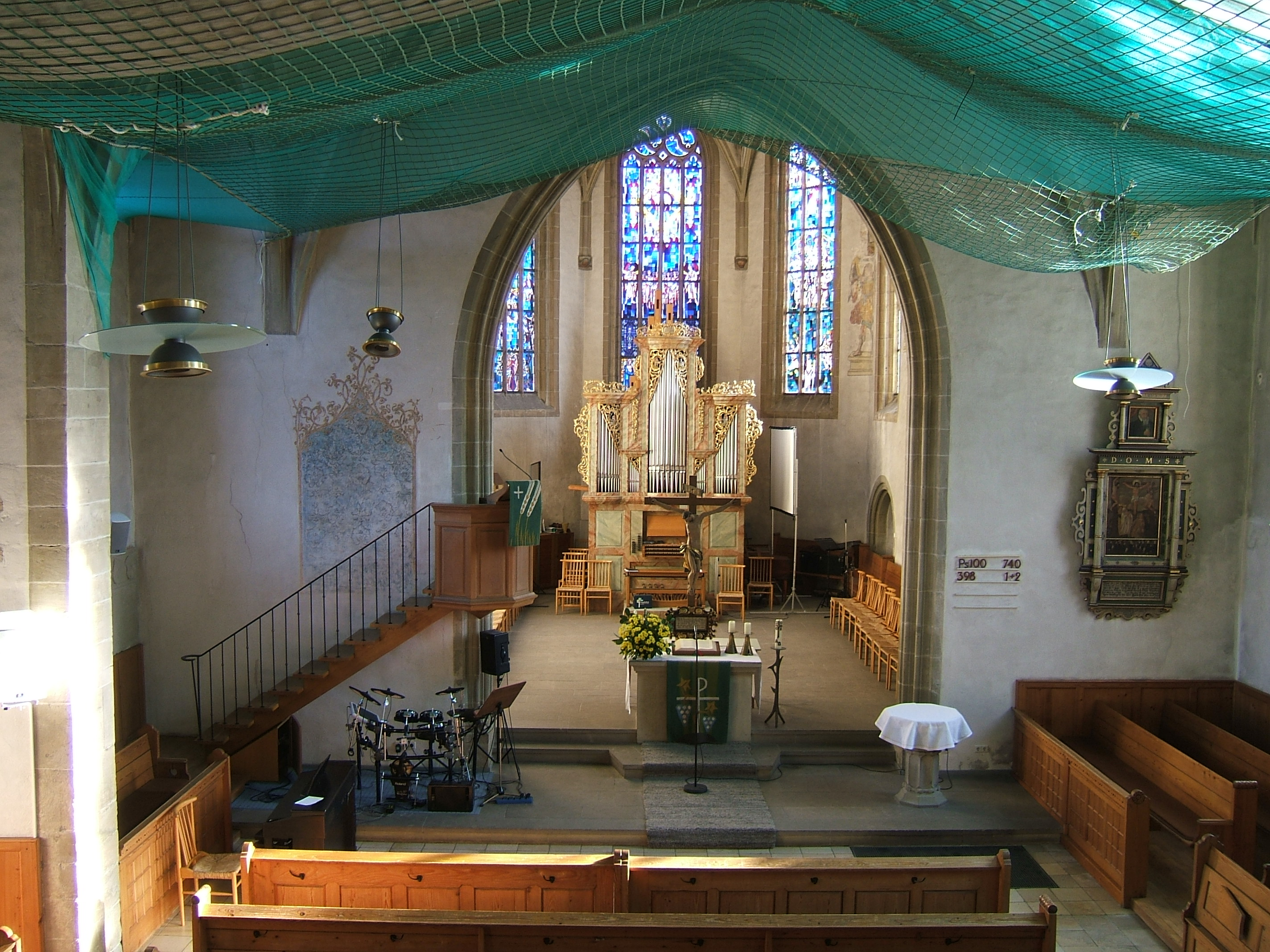
View from the west matroneum before the renovation in 2009

In 1485, 30 years after the completion of the tower, the construction of a more spacious church began with the choir. It was completed and put into use in 1496. The nave vault was completed shortly after, probably between 1498 and 1500, as evidenced by dendrochronological studies of the trees used for the nave roof truss.

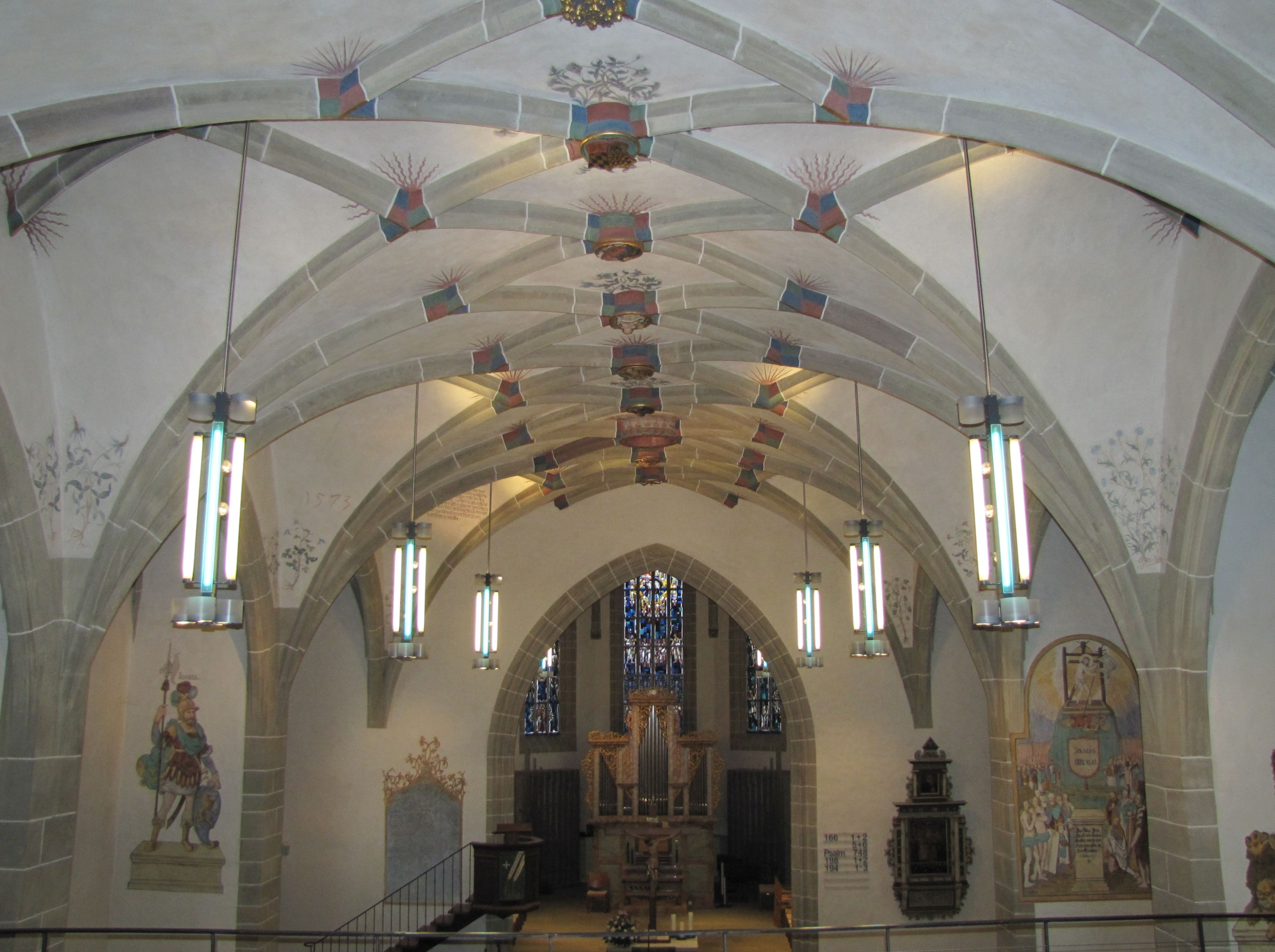
View from the west matroneum after the renovation

When the architect Christian Friedrich von Leins drew up his plans for a comprehensive renovation of the church in 1869, the church had already been repaired and renovated several times in the previous centuries. Von Leins' plans, which would have largely transformed the church into a neo-Gothic building, were not implemented, however, so the original architectural style and the old building fabric were preserved. A thorough restoration by Heinrich Dolmetsch planned in 1896 also failed to materialize. Finally, the architects Felix Schuster and Theodor Dolmetsch undertook the overdue renovation of the church in 1913. In keeping with the changed historical consciousness, they were interested in preserving what had been handed down unaltered.

A comprehensive restoration of the church interior took place in 1965 under the direction of architect Paul Heim. In the process, an oil-fired forced-air heating system was installed, wall and vault paintings were uncovered, and some changes from the 1913 renovation were reversed. An extensive renovation of the roof truss in 2007 cost 480,000 euros.

In 2008, cracks appeared in the vault, chunks of sandstone and pieces of mortar occasionally fell from the ceiling. A net stretched underneath the ceiling therefore protected visitors from the falling debris until renovation work began in mid-May 2009. During this renovation, the vault ribs, which had begun to detach from the vault due to temperature changes and also due to static defects, were fixed to the vault shell with stainless steel cores. Furthermore, the interior walls were cleaned and the heating system was replaced. The organ was cleaned, modernized and extended by two stops in the course of this church renovation. On 12 September 2010 the church was reopened with a festive service.

=== Church history ===
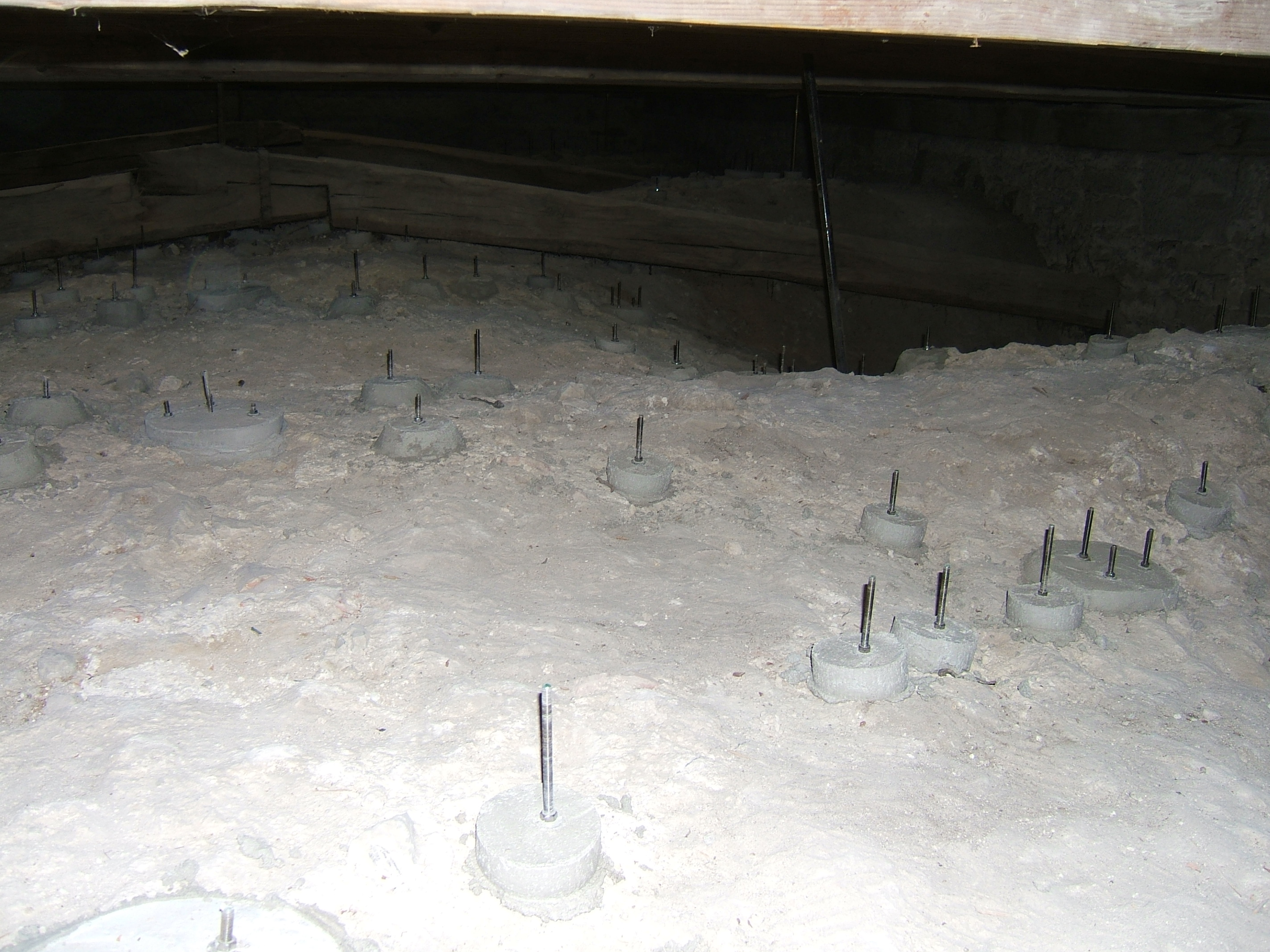
Vault of the nave from above with threaded anchors for fastening the ribbed structure

The County Palatine of Tübingen were the patronage lords of the church until the late 14th century. This function was taken over in 1382 by the House of Württemberg, which in 1456 transferred the associated rights to Herrenberg abbey, into which the church was incorporated in 1457. After the exiled Duke Ulrich returned to Württemberg in 1534, he soon introduced the Reformation and Protestant worship. The House of Württemberg had the monasteries and convents in its domain dissolved and again exercised church rights directly itself. The Protestant regional church took over the last Catholic pastor, Eustachius Kain, into its service.

It is not known exactly when St. Vitus was elevated to a patrocinium. Until 1436 he was clearly only altar and chaplain saint. The veneration of St. Vitus must have been considerable by the middle of the 15th century, so that possibly the previous church was already dedicated to St. Vitus from about 1455. However, the patrocinium probably changed with the construction of the present church.

== Building description ==
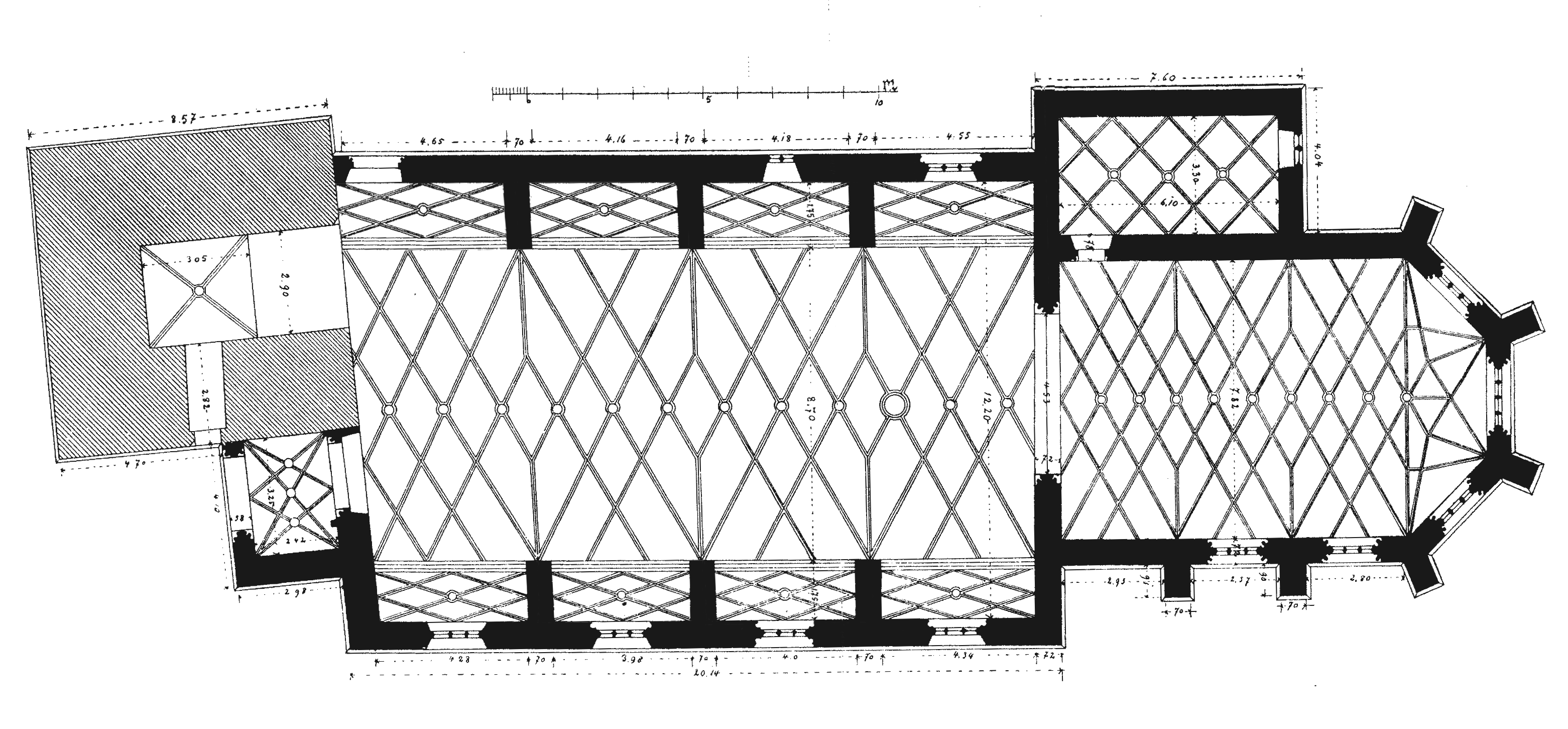
Floor plan with vault and dimensions

The church stands on the upper edge of a terrain sloping down to the south and east. The height of the surrounding wall, which is largely still in place and has been renovated on three sides, indicates its former defensive function. On the west side, the square tower rises above mighty walls. Its height of 38.5 meters, which is quite high for a village church, is based on its former function as a fortified and watchtower. The tower is shifted a little to the left of the church. It does not stand in the middle on the west side, but jumps out a bit over the nave on the north side.

The main entrance to the church is in a small porch on the tower and west wall of the nave with an almost square floor plan, oriented like the tower. The nave is just under 20 meters long and a little over 12 meters wide, including the inset chapels. It is divided into four bays by three buttresses on each long side. The west wall of the nave is the only wall of the nave oriented like the tower and porch; the interior buttresses do not abut the wall of the nave at right angles, but mediate between the two different orientations. There are inset chapels with their own vaults in the spaces between the buttresses.

To the east, the nave is joined by the choir, the width of which corresponds to that of the nave without the chapels. The choir and nave are separated by a choir arch. The choir is almost twelve meters long and has three transverse axes and a three-axis apse. The corners of the choir polygon and the axis flanks on the south side are provided with external buttresses. The rectangular sacristy, the length of which corresponds to two choir axes, adjoins the north side of the choir. In width, it projects a little beyond the alignment of the nave north wall.

All rooms have ribbed vaults; the porch, the nave with its eight chapels, the choir, and the sacristy have net-rib vaults; the tower hall, the oldest part of the church, has a cross-rib vault.

=== Tower ===
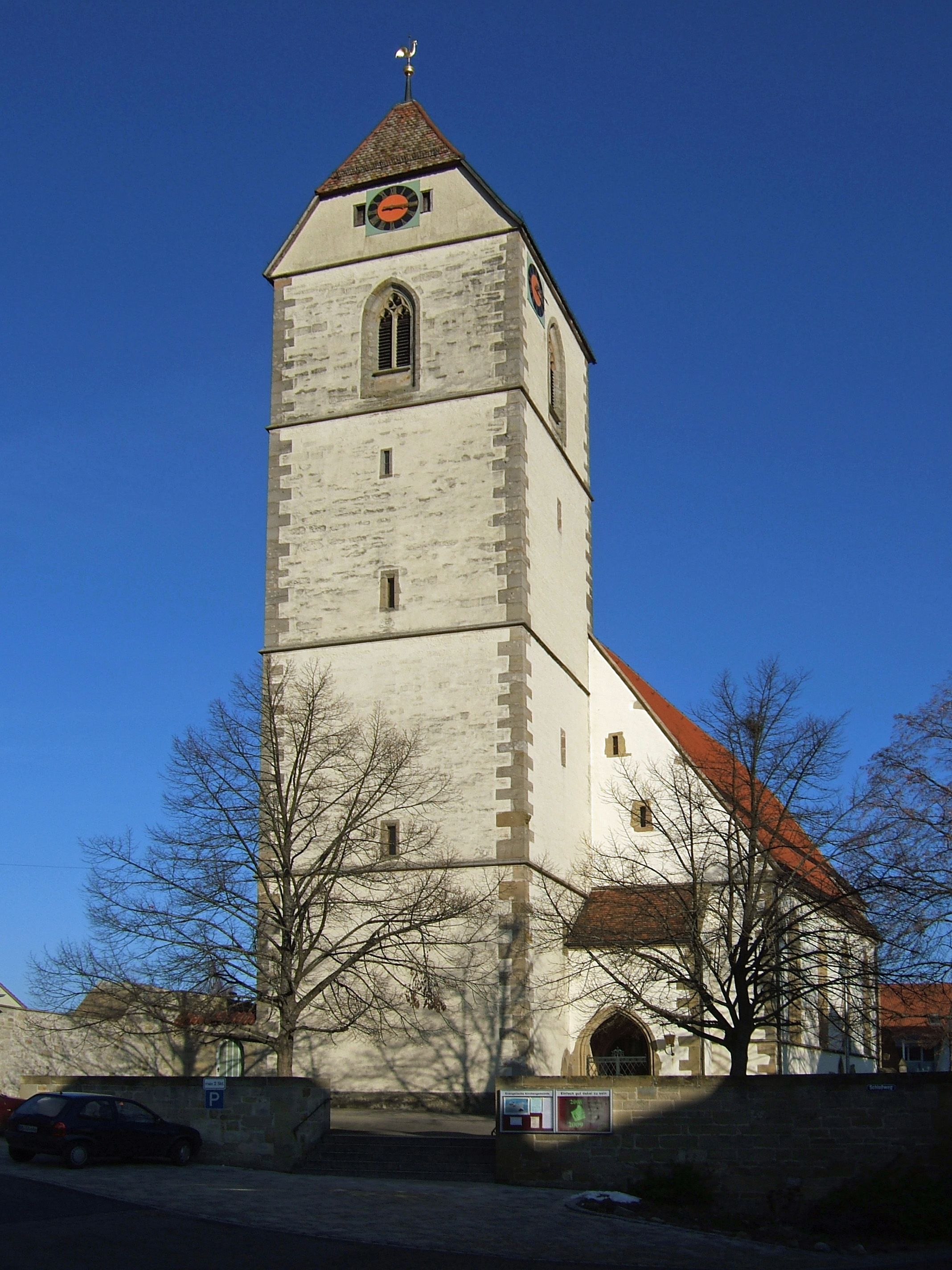
View from the west, on the left the tower, on the right the porch

The tower façade is divided into four barn floors of different heights, which are characterized by circumferential cornices. Like the entire building, the walls are made of plastered rubble. Only corner edges, cornices, and door and window jambs are made of exposed ashlars. The upper end is formed by the crippled hipped roof with half-timbered gables, which dates from the time of construction.

The three lower floors have rectangular window slits that widen inward. A large pointed arch window with tracery infill on each side serves as the sound opening for the bell frame on the fourth floor. The clock faces of the tower clock, which was added later, are set into the gables of the hipped roof facing west and east. On the north and south sides, they are set one story below.

The division of the floors inside does not correspond to the design of the facade. The oak-beamed tower internals form seven stories, including the tower attic floor. The entablature rests on steps of masonry that tapers inside from floor to floor.

=== Porch ===
The rectangular narthex, unadorned on the outside, was almost certainly not envisioned in the original planning of the church. Although the nave base continues into the narthex, and the narthex shed roof exactly matches the nave cornice, the tower door and the window slot above it are so closely adjacent to the narthex that it is assumed to be a later addition. Inside, foliage corbels support the net vault, which ends with a keystone adorned with a depiction of the church saint Vitus in the oil boiler.

=== Nave ===
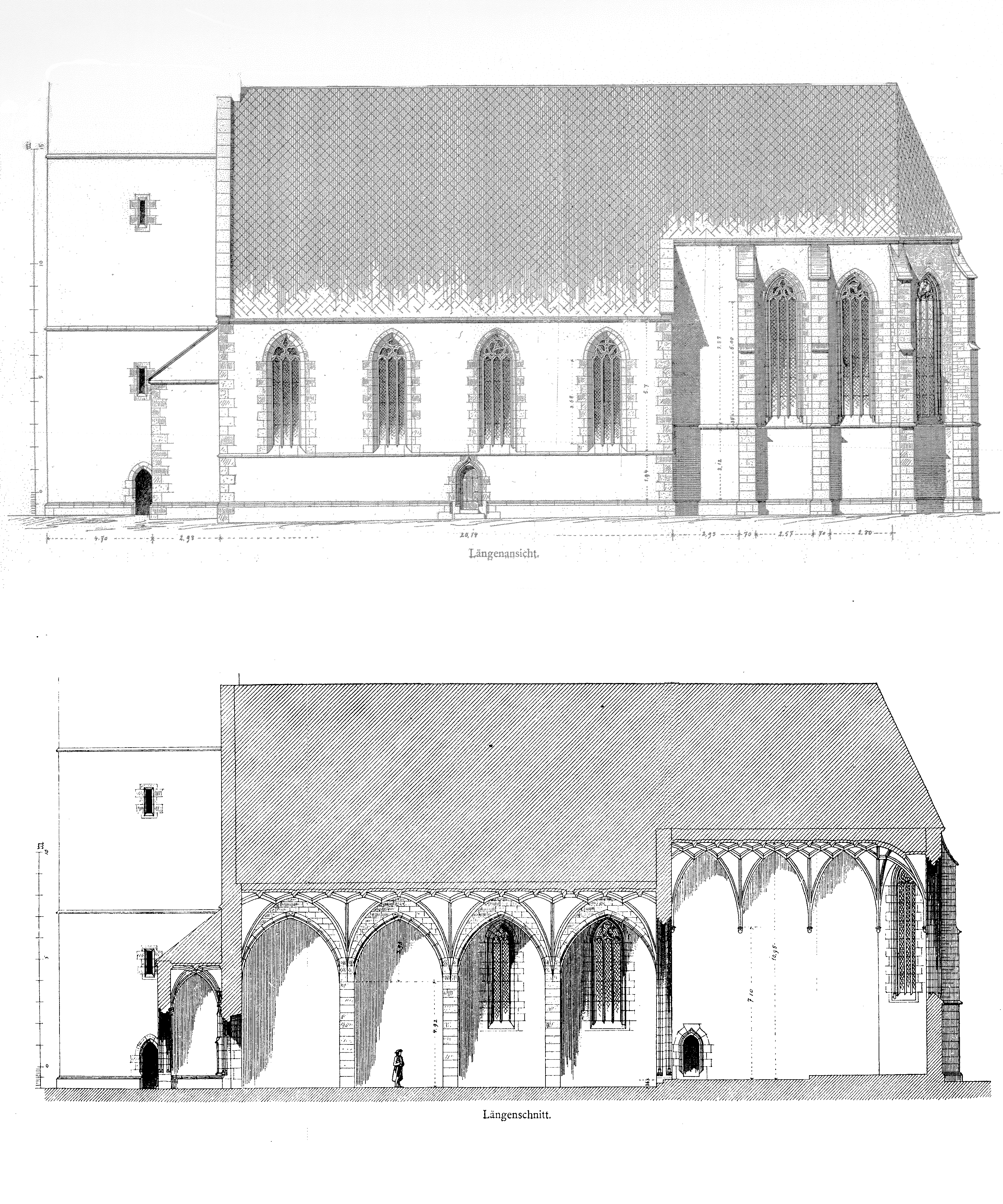
View of the south side and longitudinal section with north side, drawings by Eduard Paulus, 1893

The single-nave church is designed as a pilaster church. This means that the buttresses statically required as abutments of the vault are designed as wall piers, which in the Gärtringer church were completely drawn into the interior. The nave is thus flanked on both long sides by a series of inset chapels separated by the pilasters and opening in high arcades to the center. With the Blaubeuren Abbey and the town church of Schwaigern, there are only two other churches of this type in Württemberg.

The smooth exterior wall of the nave of St. Vitus church is subdivided by three circumferential cornices: the base cornice, the invert cornice and the roof cornice. On the south front, which is designed as a showcase, there are four large, three-light, regularly arranged pointed arch windows. The ogee-arched south portal is placed slightly east of the symmetry axis of the nave, as it would otherwise meet one of the buttresses. On the north side, only two windows originally existed in the first and second inset chapels from the east, the last being the only tracery window in the nave with only two lights. The door and window openings in the fourth inset chapel of the north side date from later times. However, the north side is largely obscured by the high churchyard wall.

The nave is spanned by a uniform net vaults, whose single-fillet ribs spring from the wall without a corbel. The height of the vault is slightly more than 9 meters, all the rib intersections located on the central axis are provided with decorated keystones. The net vaults of the eight inset chapels, which are just under a meter lower, have the same structure, each with a central keystone.

=== Choir ===
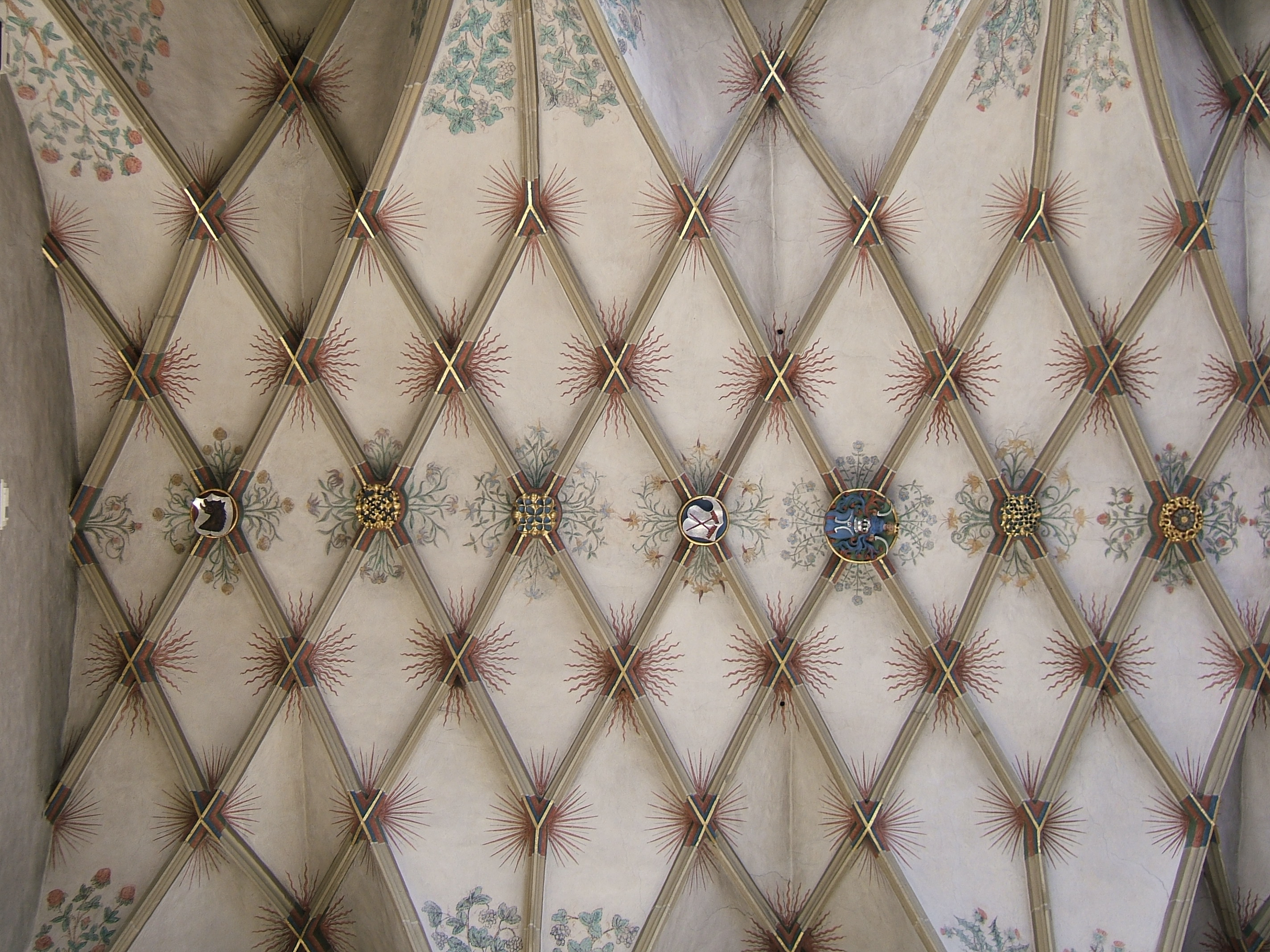
View into the choir vault

The choir is distinguished from the nave by its height and rich decoration. At just under eleven meters, the height of the choir vault exceeds that of the nave by about two meters. The considerably higher cornice and the widely raised windows make this difference already visible from the outside. Light enters the spacious choir through five tracery windows, three in the eastern end of the choir and two in the south wall. The middle of the eastern windows, the axial window, is four-lane, all others three-lane. For no apparent reason, the section of the south wall closest to the nave was not given a window. In contrast, the north wall has no windows because of the adjacent sacristy and the originally existing sacrament house. The window jambs of the choir are richly profiled inside and out. An increase compared to the nave is also formed by the more closely meshed vaulting, in which the keystones are closer together. In addition, the forked ribs are double fluted and rest on head coberls and a foliage corbel.

=== Sacristy ===
The sacristy is much changed compared to the time of construction, original are only the profiled ogee arch door to the choir and the net vault with the three keystones. A door in the west wall of the sacristy leads to the outside; the date 1766 is carved into the keystone of the pointed arch. Another door, which had been broken into the wall of the adjoining inset chapel of the nave in 1774 as an entrance to the pulpit, was bricked up again in 1965. Light enters the vestry through two high-level, small round windows in the north wall and a rectangular window in the east wall. The choir roof descends to the level of the eaves of the adjoining nave roof over the vestry. Separated by a wooden cornice at the level of the nave roof cornice, the roof continues to cover the remaining portion of the sacristy.

== Decorations and equipment ==
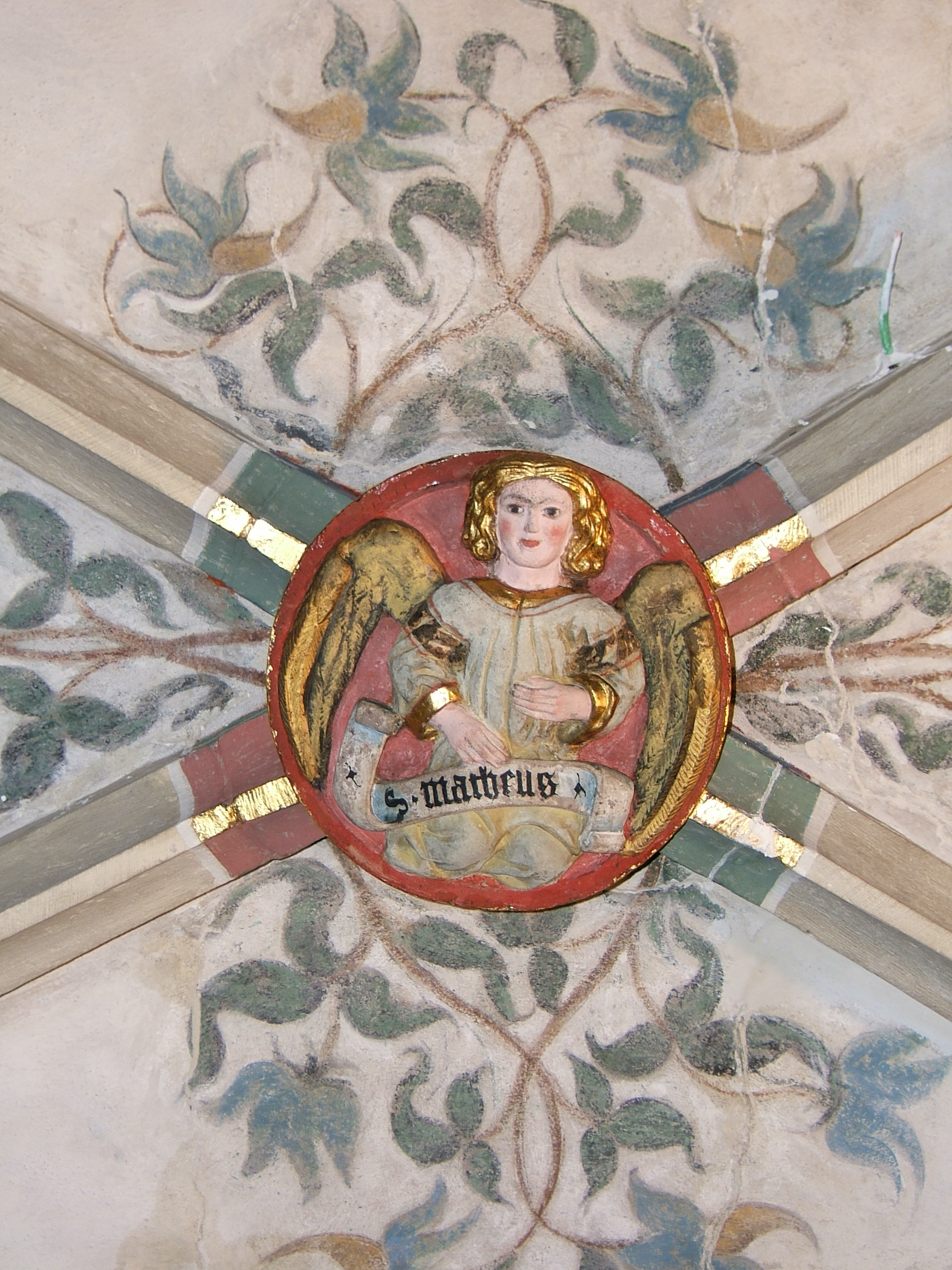
Keystone in the nave with symbol of the Gospel of Matthew

=== Keystones ===
Although triple and quatrefoils predominated as outline shapes in keystones around 1500, only round shapes occur in the Gärtringen church. There are nine keystones in the choir vault, twelve in the nave vault, and one in each of the eight inset chapels, plus the keystone of the vestibule and the three keystones of the sacristy. Most of the pieces can be divided into three groups:

1. with vegetal decoration (foliage or floral rosettes)
1. with coats of arms or achievements (empty shields, noble coats of arms or master shields)
1. with figures (saints, evangelist portrait)

One stone is decorated with the Arma Christi. The stones decorated with plant ornaments usually have no framing, the others have a narrow bead- or ribbon-shaped border, which, however, is usually overlapped by the depictions - especially evident in the Madonna keystone of the nave, where the head of Mary clearly projects beyond the round of the base.

Some of the keystones with floral ornamentation show strong similarities to those of the Herrenberg collegiate church. Especially the keystones decorated with latticed bulbous foliage of both churches can only have been made by the same stonemason. Very similar stones are also found in the cloister of Bebenhausen abbey.

=== Wall and vault paintings ===
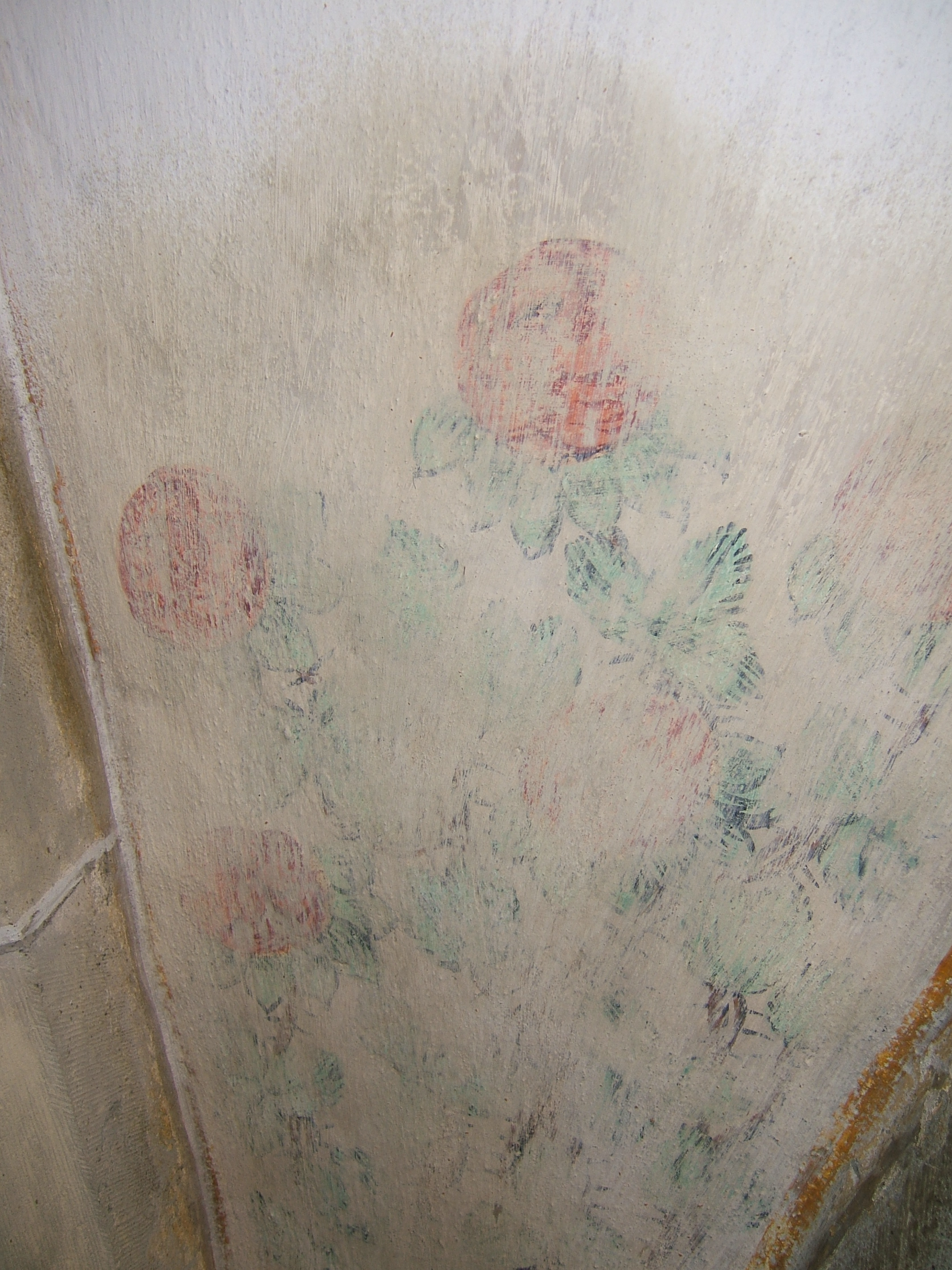
Plant paintings in the nave vault from 1500

The paintings in the Gärtringer church are mainly from the 16th and 17th centuries. All late medieval murals were only uncovered again in the 20th century. During the restorations in 1913 and 1965, the faintly recognizable parts were repainted, which partially distorted the character of the paintings.

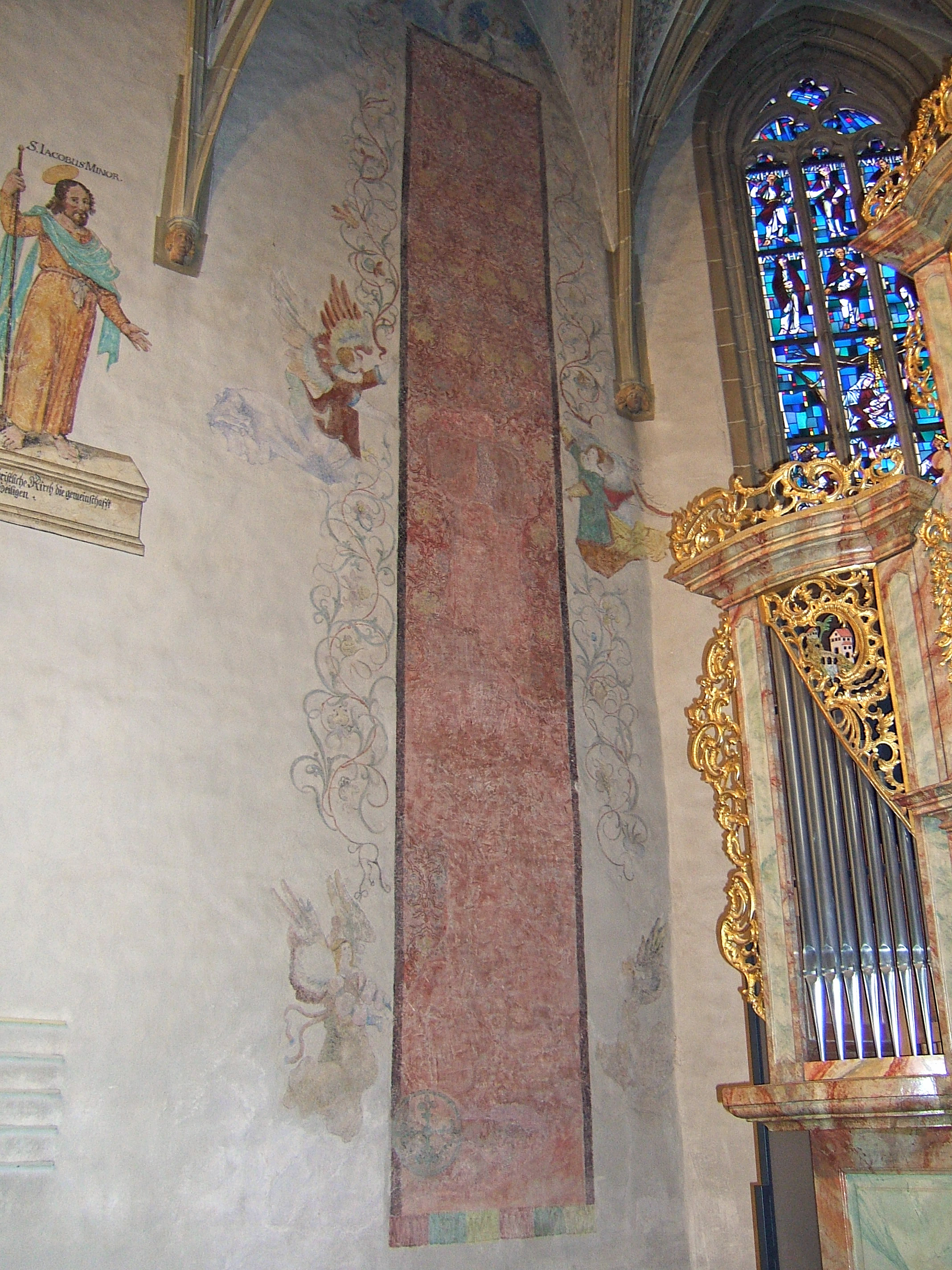
Tapestry on the chancel wall, around 1515

Among the oldest wall paintings is the painted red tapestry on the chancel north wall, which was uncovered in 1965 and can be stylistically dated to around 1515. It is a narrow, high brocade pattern that reaches to the vault and is framed by six floating angels arranged in pairs that hold the carpet. It probably formed the background of a tower-shaped sacrament house standing in front of the wall. Another painted tapestry, dating from approximately the same time, is located on the northern choir arch wall of the nave at the entrance to the pulpit. It was also uncovered in 1965. It probably served as the background of a side altar.

The plant paintings on the vaults date from different periods. The strong decorative paintings around the keystones of the nave and the inset chapels were created immediately after the vaulting around 1500. In the spandrels of the nave, very finely executed flower paintings with roots were uncovered in 1965, which appear very natural. The number 1573 in one of the spandrels probably documents the year of origin of these paintings. The somewhat coarse paintings uncovered in the choir vault, on the other hand, are more recent. The plasterer Friedrich Tödlein from Tübingen made them only in 1748.

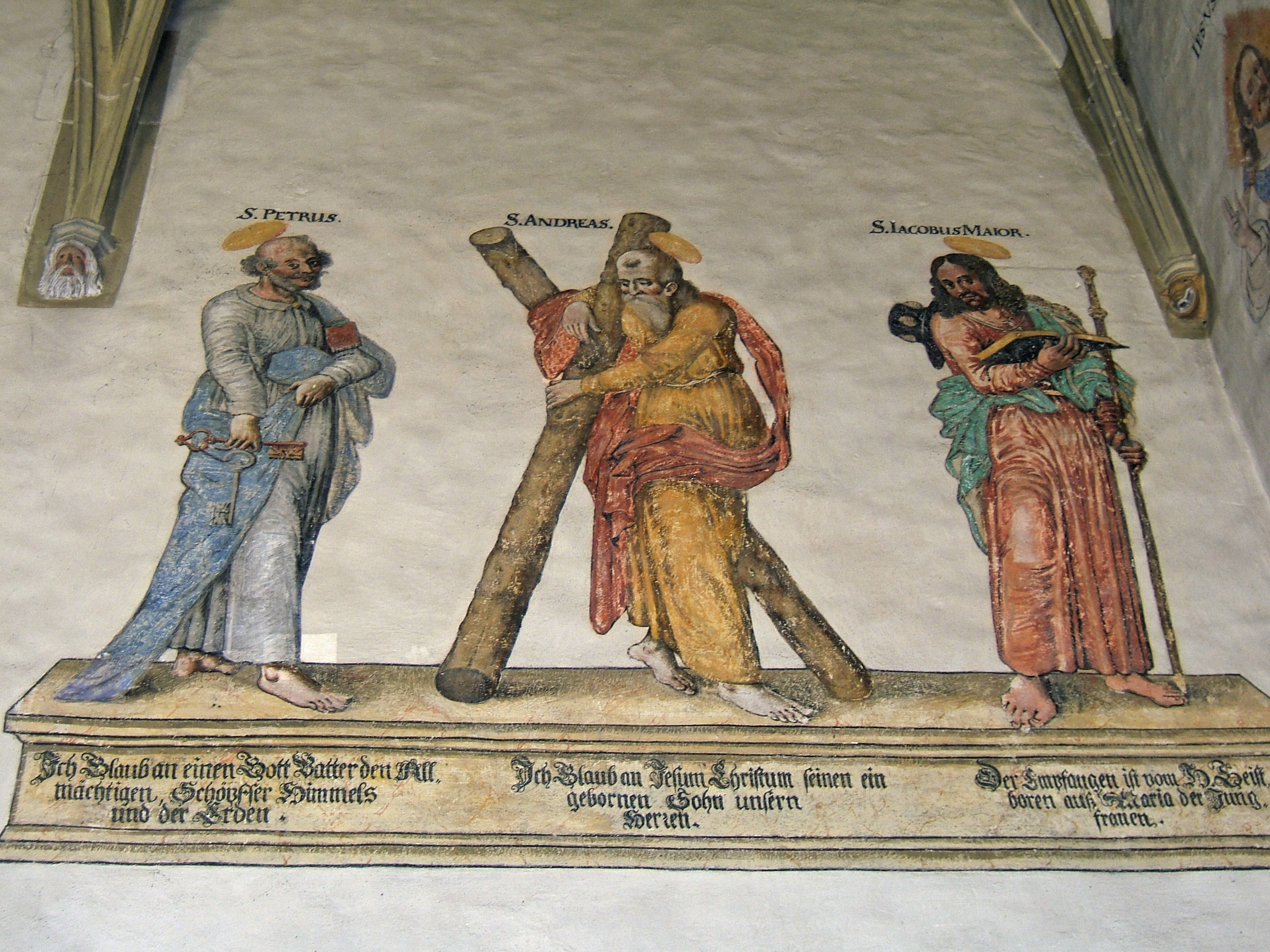
Apostle Creed cycle on the choir south wall

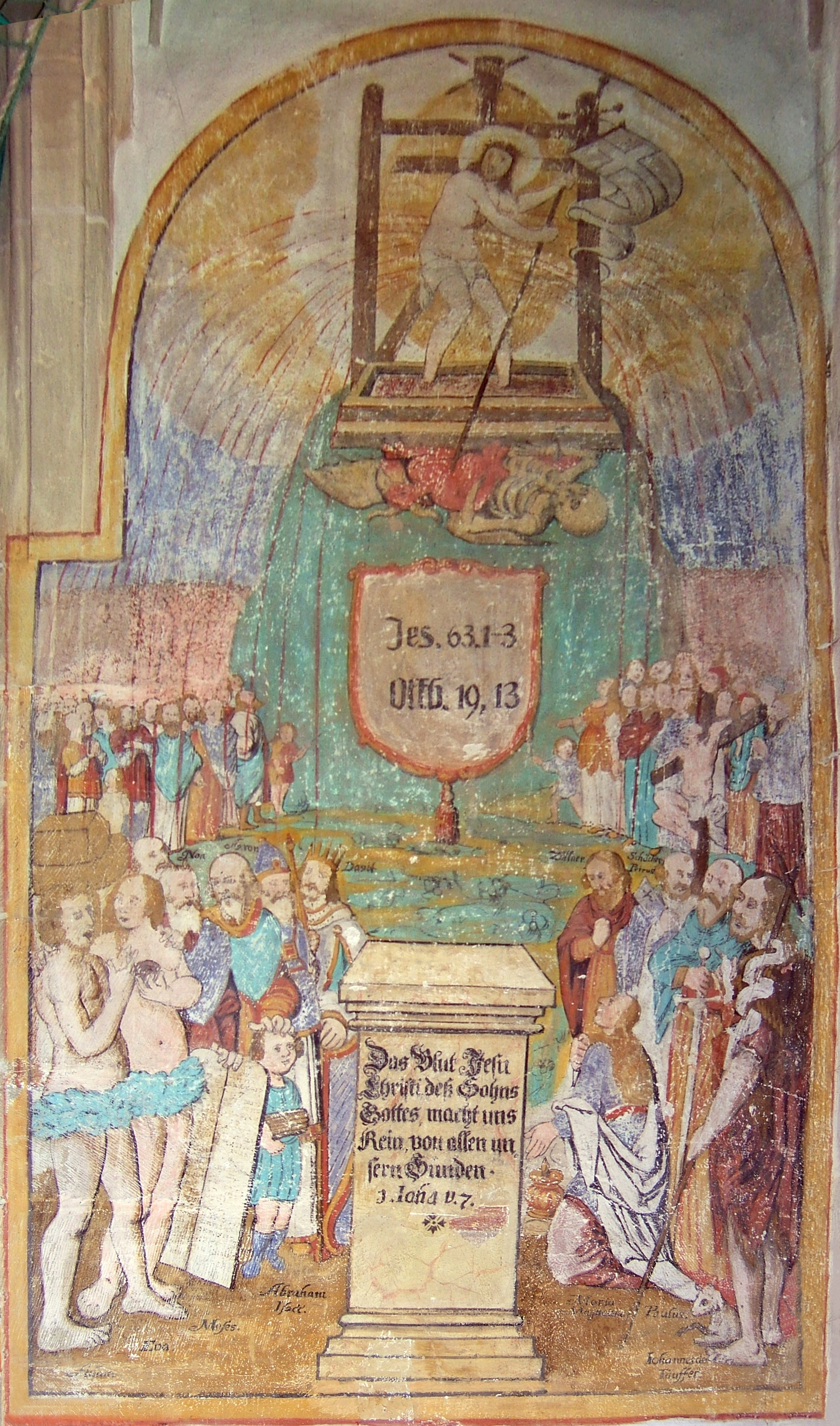
Christ in the winepress

Unlike the late medieval paintings, the 17th century murals were not painted over. However, they have been refreshed several times, as they were not frescoes but painted in mixed technique on lime slurry and are therefore less durable.

In the chancel is a circa 1660 Apostles' Creed cycle that begins on the south wall with three apostles and continues on the north wall with six more. The last three apostles on the north wall were washed away in favor of the late medieval sacrament house carpet over which they were painted. The order of the apostles, and thus the assignment of the twelve articles of the Apostles' Creed, corresponds to the common practice of combining apostles and creedal articles in a largely arbitrary manner. Between the two windows of the south wall of the choir is Apostle Paul, somewhat isolated from this cycle. The text attached to him in place of an article of creed begins with a quotation from Pauline epistles (2 Cor 11:5 EU), which underscores his ambivalent affiliation with the other apostles. The images of the apostles on the walls of the choir are complemented by one image each of Christ and John the Baptist, who is located in the northwest corner of the choir in close proximity to his namesake, John the apostle, who belongs to the cycle. In the corners of the choir polygon there were originally probably three representations of archangels, of which only Rafael is preserved.

Four paintings in the nave, also made around 1660, are the remaining remnants of an extensive series of biblical figures. In the second northern inset chapel are Moses and Joshua, in the southern inset chapels are Simeon and Daniel. Documented by old photographs are other wall paintings, including the four evangelists with their evangelists portraits. In the second southern inset chapel of the nave is a 17th-century painting donated by Ulrich Oberanns in 1665. It depicts Christ in the winepress treaders and is based on the title page of the Elector Bible, first printed in 1641.

=== Stained glass ===
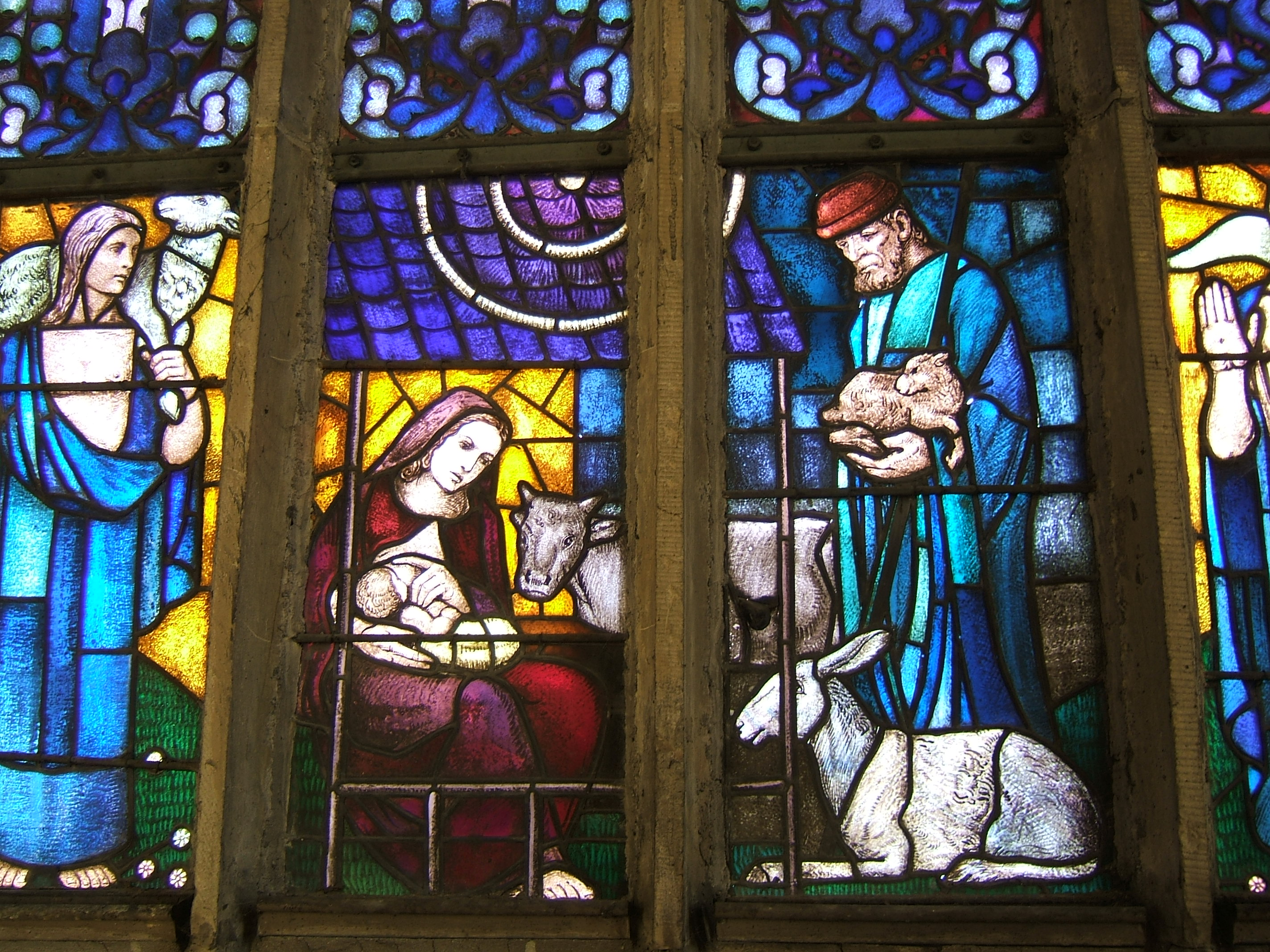
Art Nouveau stained glass in the axial window of the choir, the central panes thematize the birth of Christ

The stained glass windows from 1913 and 1965 are from the stained glass workshop of Valentin Saile in Stuttgart. The eight Art Nouveau panes from 1913, designed by the painter Eduard Pfennig (1878-1952, brother of the architect Oscar Pfennig) were originally distributed among the three closing windows of the choir. Today they are grouped in the lower two rows of the axial window and are covered by the organ. Two panes in the lower row thematize the birth of Christ, one shows Christ as the Good Shepherd, and one shows the Risen Christ. The row above contains four ornamentally designed panes. In 1965, the three choir polygon windows, the middle one above the Art Nouveau panes, received new glazing in which the stained glass fills the entire window. They were created by Adolf Valentin Saile and depict the following biblical scenes: (left from top) six prophets, Adoration of the Magi and Shepherds, Fall of Man; (center from top) Heavenly Jerusalem, Lamb, Stream of Living Water, Angels escorting the redeemed peoples to Heavenly Jerusalem - below the Art Nouveau discs; (right from top) Women at the Empty Tomb, Good Shepherd, Pentecost, Martyr Stephen and Apostle Paul.

=== Altar with altar cross ===
The stone altar block was renewed in 1913 and fundamentally changed in 1965. The baroque wooden altar grille from 1702 was replaced by a new one in 1913, which was removed in 1965. The altar crucifix has a height of 1.16 meters and dates back to 1665. The crucified is depicted with an overlong, slender, yet muscular body. The crucifix was restored in 1923 and 1965. On the trunk of the cross is a plaque in honor of the donor Ulrich Oberanns, who was a "Bereiter" - a position between equerry and stable staff - probably also a riding instructor for the noble students of the Collegium illustre.

=== Pulpit ===
Originally, since the end of the 16th century, the pulpit together with the stone scroll staircase was located at the central northern wall pillar of the nave. Since churches in the Middle Ages were rarely equipped with lay pews, the worshippers could easily see and understand the preacher at this central place of the transverse church. After a fixed pew was installed, this stone pulpit was moved one pier further toward the chancel in 1774, since otherwise the preacher would have had his seat at the back of the front rows of listeners. A door in the east wall of the first north chapel made the pulpit accessible from the vestry. In 1913, the previous stone pulpit was replaced by a wooden pulpit with a sounding board in the form of a volute pyramid, which was moved to its present location on the north side of the chancel arch during the 1965 renovation. It was given a simpler foot cornice in the process; the support and sound lid were removed. The new rectilinear staircase has an unadorned iron railing.

=== Other furnishings ===
On the south side of the choir there is a sedilia niche built into the wall. The niche has a round-arched, profiled end. The stone bench was later pierced to place a tombstone in the niche, but it is no longer there.

From the cup-shaped octagonal baptismal font of the 15th century only the cupola has been preserved. The original base, like the cupola, was strongly profiled and the shaft was surrounded by round rods on cylindrical pedestals.

The church originally had a west matroneum and from 1699 also a choir gallery. Both galleries were renewed several times before the choir gallery was removed in 1913 and the west gallery had to make way for a new construction in 1965. The present congregational pews date from 1913, the only decoration being the cheekpieces, which consist alternately of a rose window and a recumbent cylinder with incised diamond ornament.

== Tombstones ==
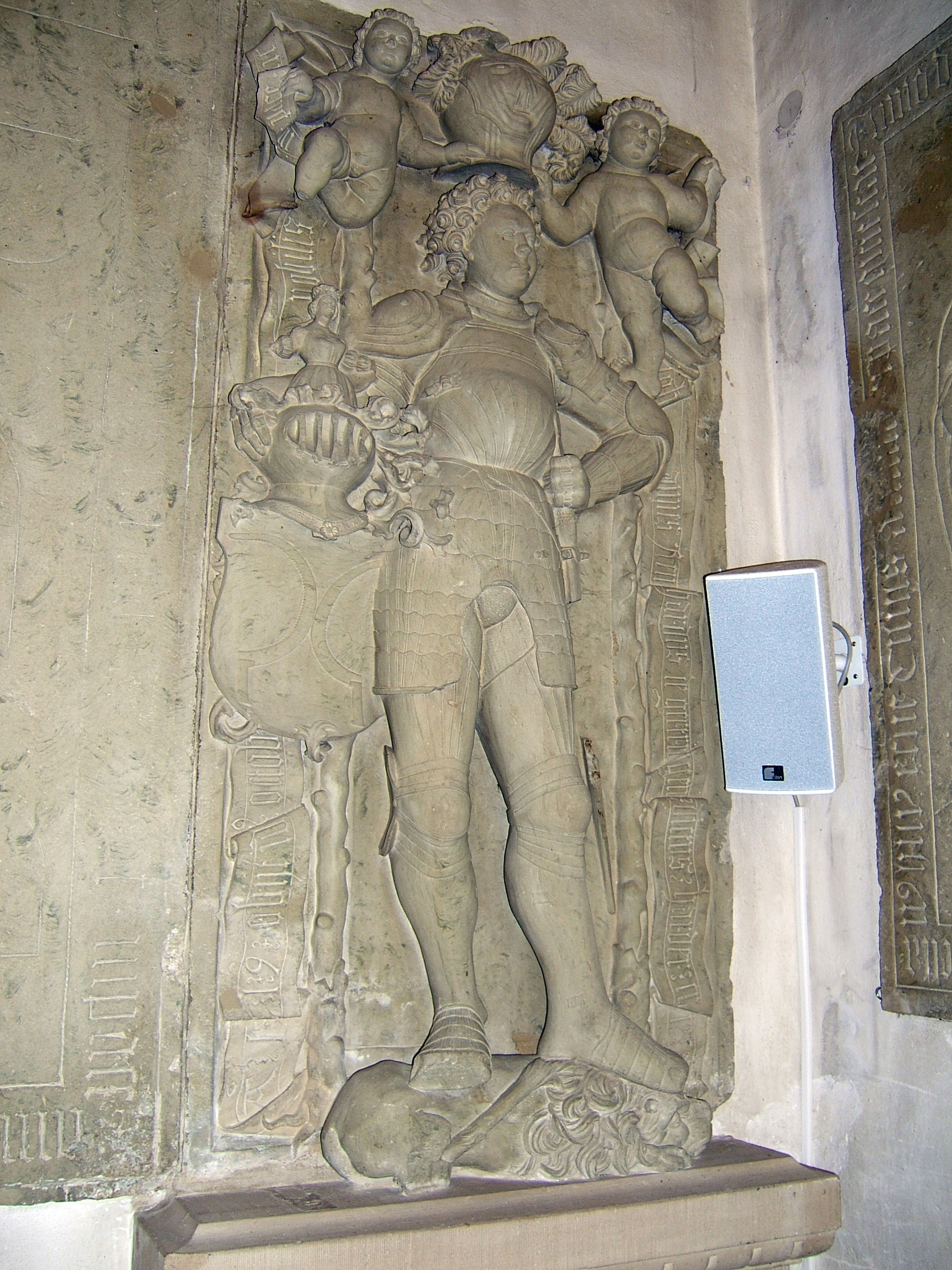
Grave monument of Johann Renhard von Gärtringen, called Harder

Especially in the choir there are a number of funerary monuments and tombstones from the 15th and 16th centuries. They commemorate clergymen and members of the local nobility who were buried in the church at that time. The grave monument of Johann Renhard von Gärtringen, called Harder, who died in 1519, is of outstanding craftsmanship and, apart from a few insignificant missing parts, well preserved. It shows a knight in full armor standing on a reclining lion. Above the knight hover two putti holding a visored helmet over his head. In comparison with contemporaneous funerary monuments, this one has some peculiarities, for example, the motif of the hovering putti with helmet is iconographically unusual. The identity of the sculptor is unknown.

Another striking grave slab is that of Hans von Gärtringen, called Harder, who died in 1559. He was the last member of the Harder family, which is why his coat of arms was overturned, i.e. upside down, as a sign of the extinction of the family. The tomb slab was erected in 1913 and placed on the north wall of the choir, but probably inverted because of the fallen coat of arms, so that the writing is upside down.

== Epitaph ==
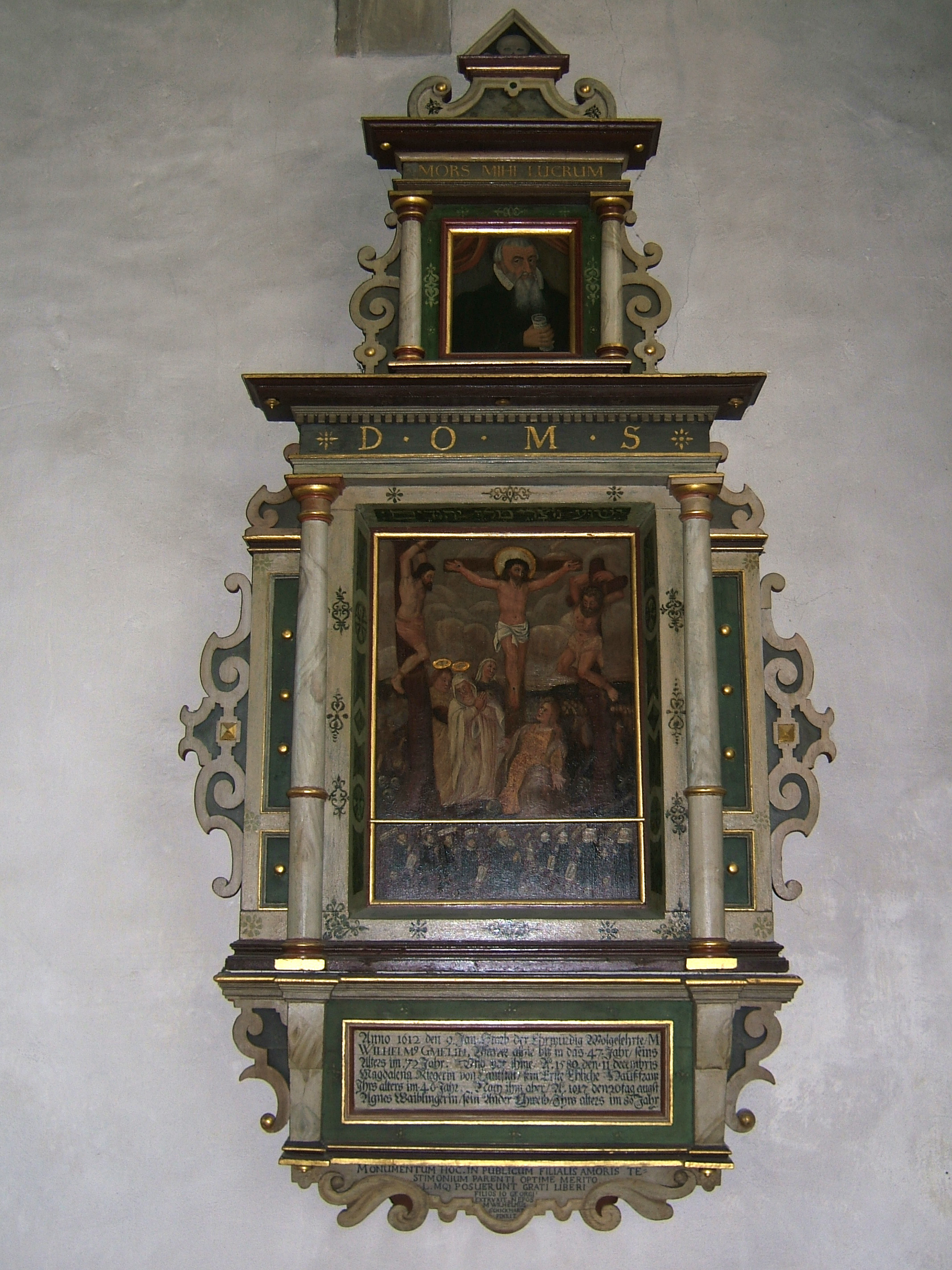
Epitaph for Magister Wilhelm Gmelin

In addition to other grave slabs and funerary shields on and in the church, there are also two wooden epitaphs in the nave. One is dedicated to Ulrich Oberanns, who, among other things, donated the altar cross, the other to Wilhelm Gmelin, the long-time pastor of Gärtringen, who died in 1612. This is located today next to the southern choir arch. It has a three-part structure and is surrounded by Renaissance ornaments. The central panel contains a crucifixion group as the main painting, and below it is a landscape painting of the priest's family. The epitaph was made by Wilhelm's son Johann Georg. When the epitaph made by him was painted, he was already deceased, because a skull was assigned to him in the family picture. The epitaph was painted by Wilhelm's grandson, Magister Wilhelm Schickard, who, being versatile, is also considered to be the designer of the first functioning mechanical calculating machine.

== Organ ==
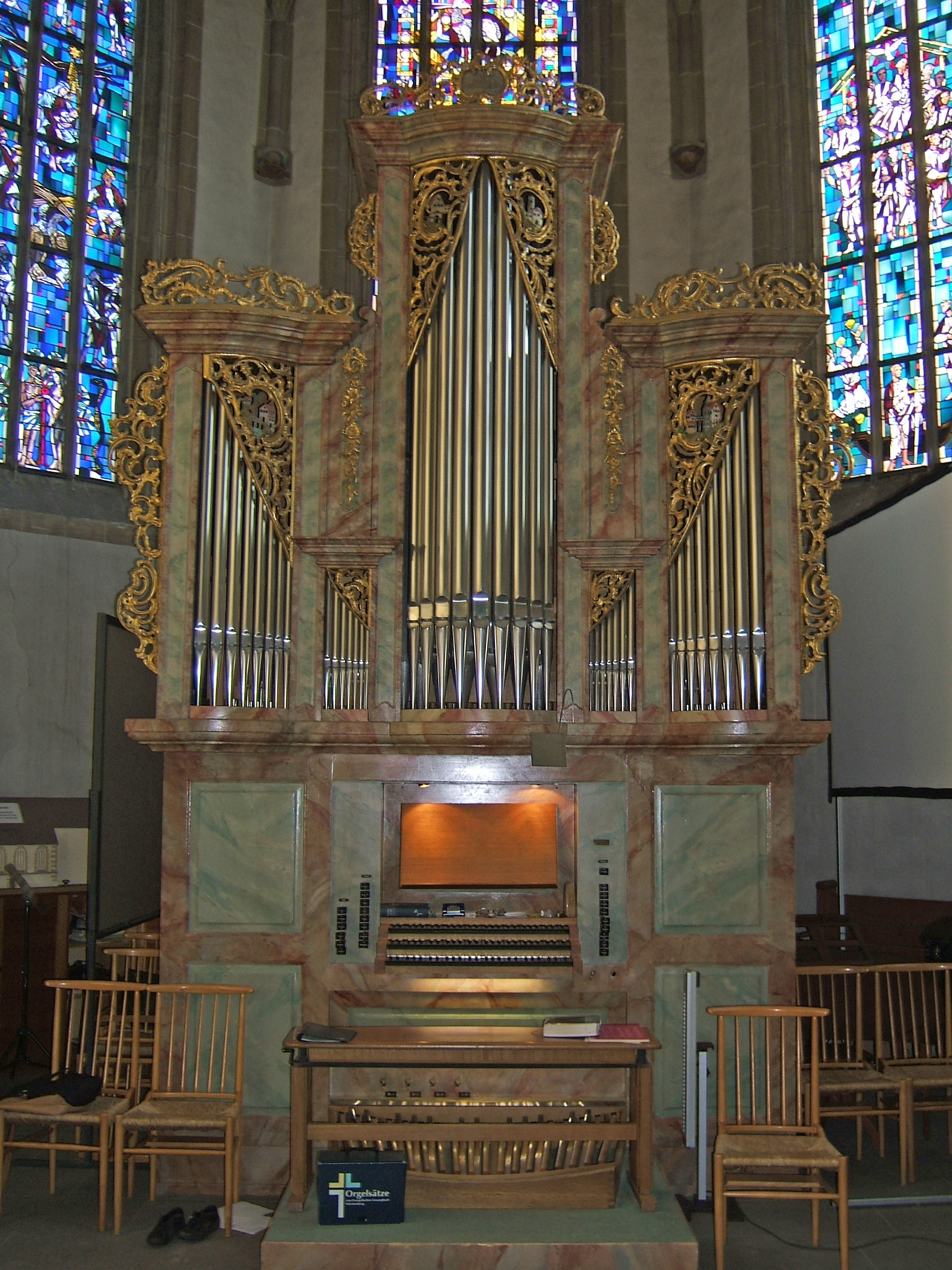
Organ from 1989 with casing from 1762

In 1699, St. Vitus church received its first organ. It was made by the Herrenberg organ maker Eberhard Vischer and had six organ stop. In 1760 Johann Sigmund Haußdörffer was commissioned to add five stops to the instrument. It is not known whether and to what extent he changed or replaced the previous stops. Like its predecessor, the new organ stood in the choir loft of the time. The single-manual instrument did not yet have a pedal; it corresponded to the late Baroque sound ideal and had a solid sound foundation with one 16′- and four 8′- organ stops.

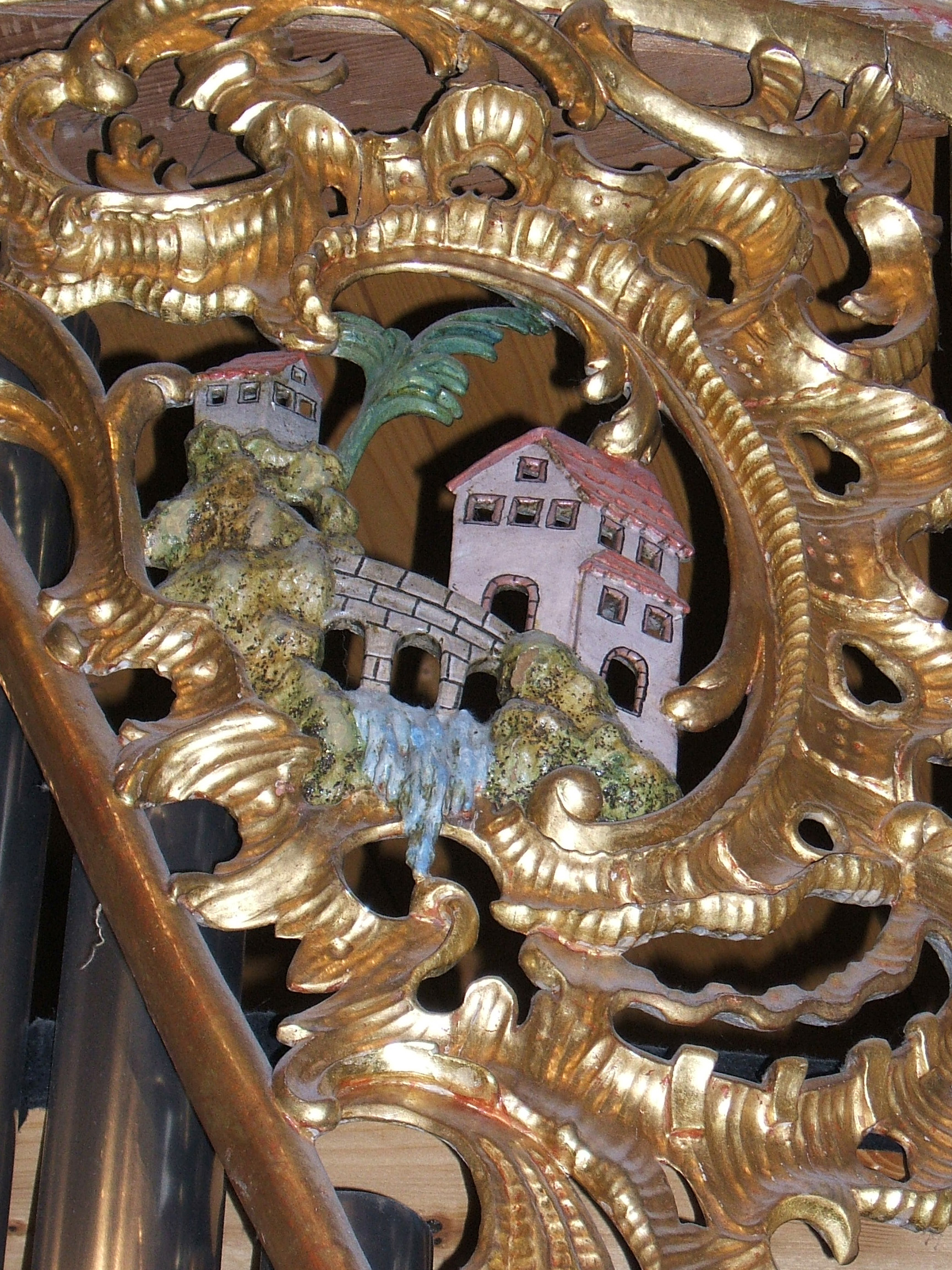
Landscape depictions in the rocaille ornaments of the organ prospect

During the renovation of the church in 1913, the organ was reworked by the organ builder Friedrich Weigle (Echterdingen) and now placed centrally in front of the axial window of the choir polygon. The instrument now received a late-Romantic disposition and had 14 stops on two manuals and pedal; by means of transmissions, the variety of sound was inexpensively expanded. The organ had pneumatic diaphragm chests and a self-playing organization, soon popularly called "Organola"; Weigle described it as "protected by law" and "built directly into the console, complete with tempo control, forward and backward motion, wind intake and wind exhaust, working absolutely exact."

In the 1980s, experts attested to the organ's good craftsmanship; however, it was deemed too small for the church or insufficient for liturgical requirements and not worthy of preservation musically. In addition, the pneumatic action had become uneven and prone to failure. In 1986, a call for tenders was issued for the construction of a new organ, the sound of which was to be oriented to the period in which the building was built. The contract was awarded to the organ building company Rensch from Lauffen am Neckar; they had offered a two-manual instrument with mechanical actions, tonally oriented to the southern German organ type, supplemented by powerful reed pipes. In 1987, the decision was made to expand the pedal organ and to make it playable via an additional third manual. The old case of the Haußdörffer organ from 1762 was retained and restored, and the new case parts were made in a matching style. The costs amounted to 330,000 DM. On 2 April 1989, Quasimodo, the instrument was inaugurated.

In the course of the church renovation in 2009, two stops were added to the Hauptwerk. In addition, the organ was given a new large pedalboard movement, so that the bass movement - previously also the pedalboard - now became exclusively the manual movement. Since 2009, the slider chest instrument has 32 stops on three manual movements and pedalboard. The actions are mechanical, the stop action is additionally electric and connected to a setting system. The temperament is unequal temperament according to Kirnberger II. The organ has the following stoplist (for the individual stop names, see the list of pipe organ stops):

I Hauptwerk C–g^{3}
1.	Prinzipal	8′
2.	Großgedeckt	8′
3.	Flöte	8′
4.	Bifara	8′
5.	Octave	4′
6.	Kleingedeckt	4′
7.	Quinte	2 2/3′
8.	Octave	2′
9.	Mixtur IV	1 1/3′
10.	Trompete	8′

II Positiv C–g^{3}
11.	Gedeckt	8′
12.	Quintade	8′
13.	Prinzipal	4′
14.	Rohrflöte	4′
15.	Sesquialter II	2 2/3′
16.	Doublette	2′
17.	Larigot	1 1/3′
18.	Scharf IV	1′
19.	Cromorne	8′
	Tremulant	

III Basswerk C–g^{3}
20.	Bourdon	16′
21.	Octav	8′
22.	Spitzflöte	8′
23.	Choral	4′
24.	Hohlflöte	2′
25.	Fagott	16′

Großpedal C–f^{1}
26.	Untersatz	32′
27.	Kontrabass	16′
28.	Subbass	16′
29.	Violon	8′
30.	Gedeckbass	8′
31.	Posaune	8′
32.	Trompete	4′

- Couplers: II/I, III/I, I/P, II/P, III/P

== Bells ==
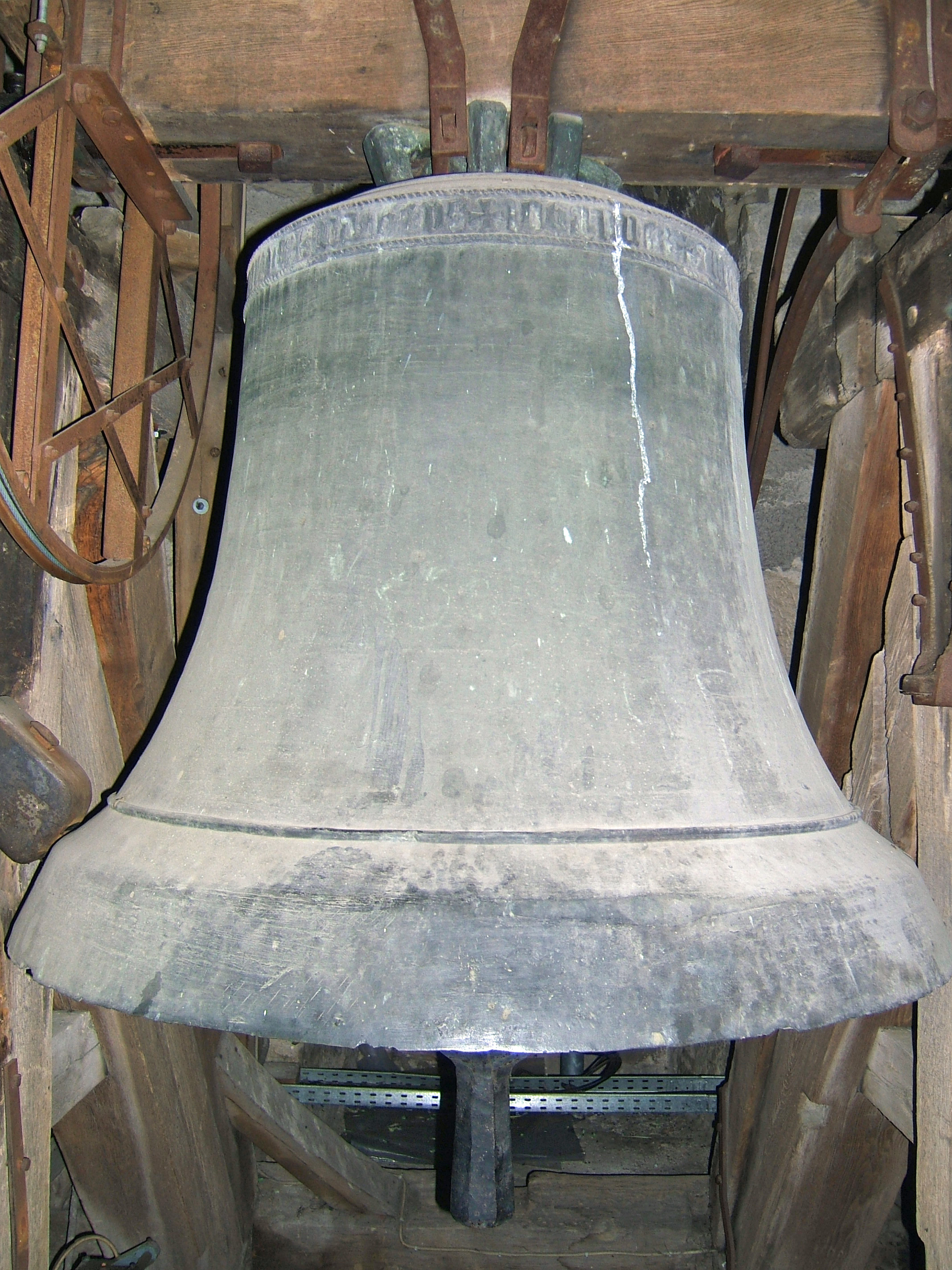
Large bell from 1456

It is assumed that the church received a new belfry in 1527, in any case, this date is carved on one of the struts and the construction of the chair corresponds to late Gothic style. Another bell probably made the new chair necessary, it is certain that the chair carried three bells at that time. The large, still existing bell Dominica from 1456 can be attributed to the Reutlingen foundry of Hans Eger, especially because in the Herrenberg collegiate church with the noon bell hangs a bell cast by Eger, only slightly younger, which is almost a copy of the Dominica. The bell is a copy of the Dominica. In 1527 there was still a small c2 bell on the tower, which did not have any inscription and ornamentation, which suggests a great age; it was probably cast in the 13th or 14th century. In January 1901 this bell cracked and since welding was not possible at that time, it was melted down together with another small bell and recast. Relatively little is known about the third bell. According to the dimensions of the southern separator, this one was only slightly smaller than the largest one, the diameter is estimated at 100 to 110 centimeters, the weight at 600 to 900 kilograms. Sometime between 1761 and 1828 this bell must have been taken down, the reason for this is not known.

In each of the two world wars the church lost almost all the bells. After the World War II only the largest bell remained, because it was not brought out of the tower window. It is historically the most valuable. As a replacement for the delivered bells, the Heinrich Kurtz bell foundry in Stuttgart cast three new bells between 1949 and 1954. In 1996, the year of the church's 500th anniversary, the church received the new baptismal bell as its fifth bell, which, as the smallest, brightest-sounding bell, expands the sound pattern, resulting in the Salve Regina motif. The new bell is the first of its kind in the church.

Nº	Name	Casting year	Cast	Weight (kg)	Diameter (cm)	Strike tone
1	Dominica	1456	Hans Eger, Reutlingen	1250	125,0	f^{1}
2	Betglocke	1949	Heinrich Kurtz, Stuttgart	847	108,4	g^{1}
3	Kreuzglocke	1954	Heinrich Kurtz, Stuttgart	607	96,7	a^{1}
4	Zeichenglocke	1954	Heinrich Kurtz, Stuttgart	366	81,9	c^{2}
5	Taufglocke	1996	A. Bachert, Heilbronn	260	73,0	d^{2}

== Use ==
The church is used by the Protestant parish of Gärtringen, which has about 4000 members and is assigned to the church district of Herrenberg. The congregation is divided into the parishes East and West, the congregation of the district Rohrau has its own church with the Christuskirche. The services in the St. Vitus church are mainly held on Sunday mornings. Occasionally, the church is also a venue for organ and gospel concerts. It is open to the public before and after services, during events, and every last Sunday of the month from 2 to 5 pm.

== Bibliography ==
- Fritz Heimberger (Red.): Kirchen im Landkreis Böblingen, (Hrsg.) Evang. Kreisbildungswerk und Kath. Bildungswerk Kreis Böblingen; München/Zürich, 1990, S. 52
- Evangelische Kirchengemeinde Gärtringen (Hrsg.): Evangelische St.-Veit-Kirche Gärtringen: 1496–1996. Gärtringen 1996
- Eduard Paulus: Die Kunst und Altertumsdenkmale im Königreich Württemberg. Inventar Schwarzwaldkreis. Paul Neff Verlag, Stuttgart 1897
