= Gärtringen =

- Municipality
- Coat of arms

- Location of Gärtringen within Böblingen district
- Interactive map of Gärtringen
- Location within Germany Location within Baden-Württemberg
- Coordinates: 48°38′27″N 8°54′2″E
- Country: Germany
- State: Baden-Württemberg
- Admin. region: Stuttgart
- District: Böblingen
- Subdivisions: 2

Government
  - Mayor (2023–31): Thomas Riesch (CDU)

Area
  - Total: 20.21 km^{2} (7.80 sq mi)
- Elevation: 476 m (1,562 ft)

Population (2025-12-31)
  - Total: 12,895
  - Density: 638.1/km^{2} (1,653/sq mi)
- Time zone: UTC+01:00 (CET)
  - Summer (DST): UTC+02:00 (CEST)
- Postal codes: 71112–71116
- Dialling codes: 07034
- Vehicle registration: BB
- Website: www.gaertringen.de

Gärtringen (German pronunciation: [ˈɡɛʁtʁɪŋən]) is a municipality in the district of Böblingen, Baden-Württemberg, Germany. It is situated 25 km southwest of Stuttgart, 7 km north of Herrenberg, and consists of the villages Rohrau and Gärtringen.

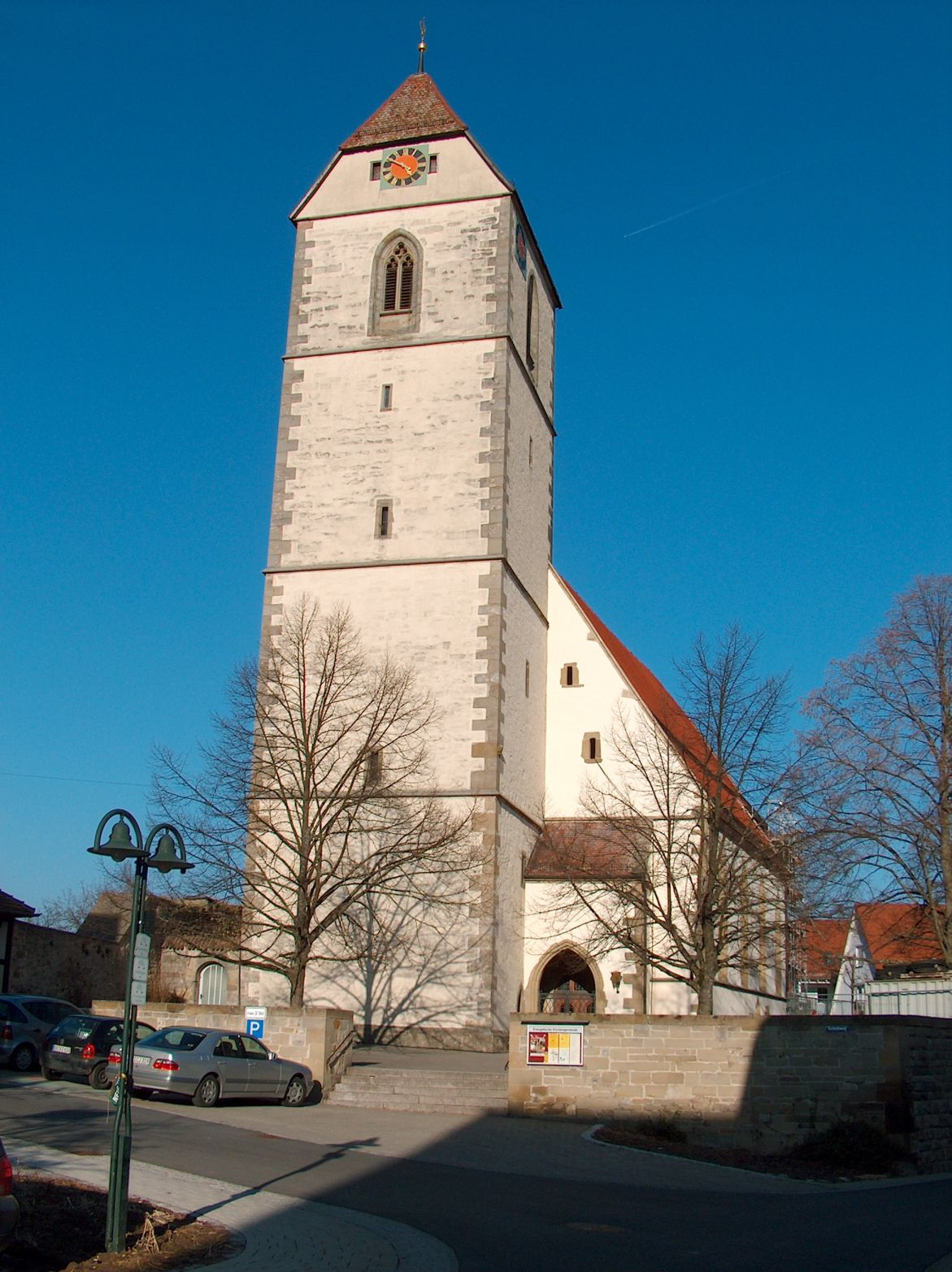
St. Vitus Church in Gärtringen

== History ==
The oldest traces of settlement in the district date back to the Hallstatt period. Ancient, possibly Roman, settlement remains can be found at Hardtheimer Brünnele. The place name “Gärtringen” is of Alemannic origin, whereby the settlement is probably named after a Gartheri. Gärtringen was first mentioned in a document in 1140. Originally subject to the County of Calw, then to the Palatine Counts of Tübingen, the municipality became a part of Württemberg in 1382.

During the district reform of Württemberg during the Nazi era, Gärtringen became part of the Böblingen district in 1938. In 1945, Gärtringen became part of the American occupation zone and thus belonged to the newly founded state of Baden-Württemberg, which merged into its current state in 1952.

== Notable residents ==
- Friedrich Sieburg (1893–1964), journalist, writer and literary critic, lived in the Villa Schwalbenhof from the 1950s until his death.
- Qianhong Gotsch (born 1968), Chinese-German table tennis player

== Photo Gallery ==
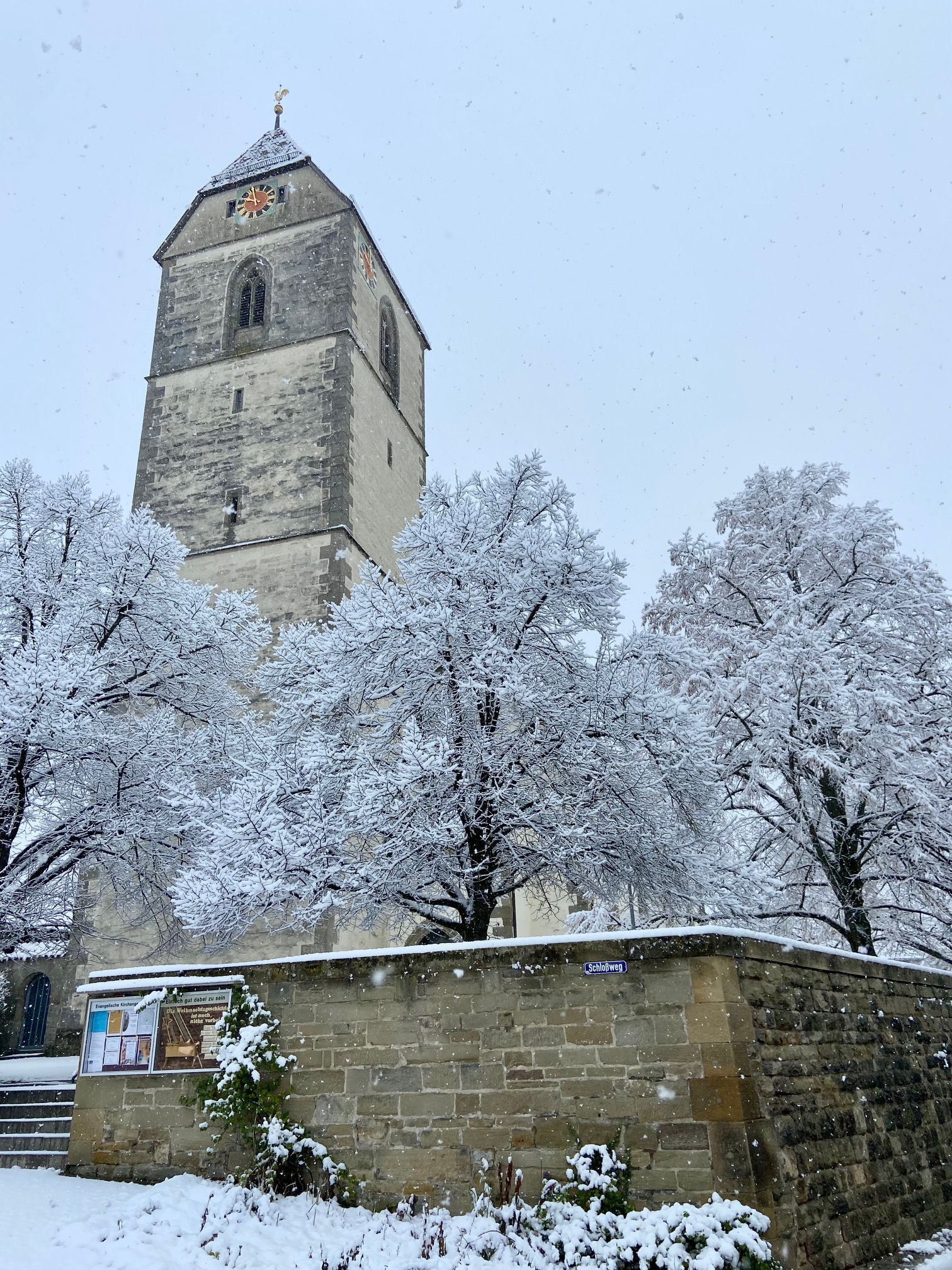
St. Veit Church in Winter

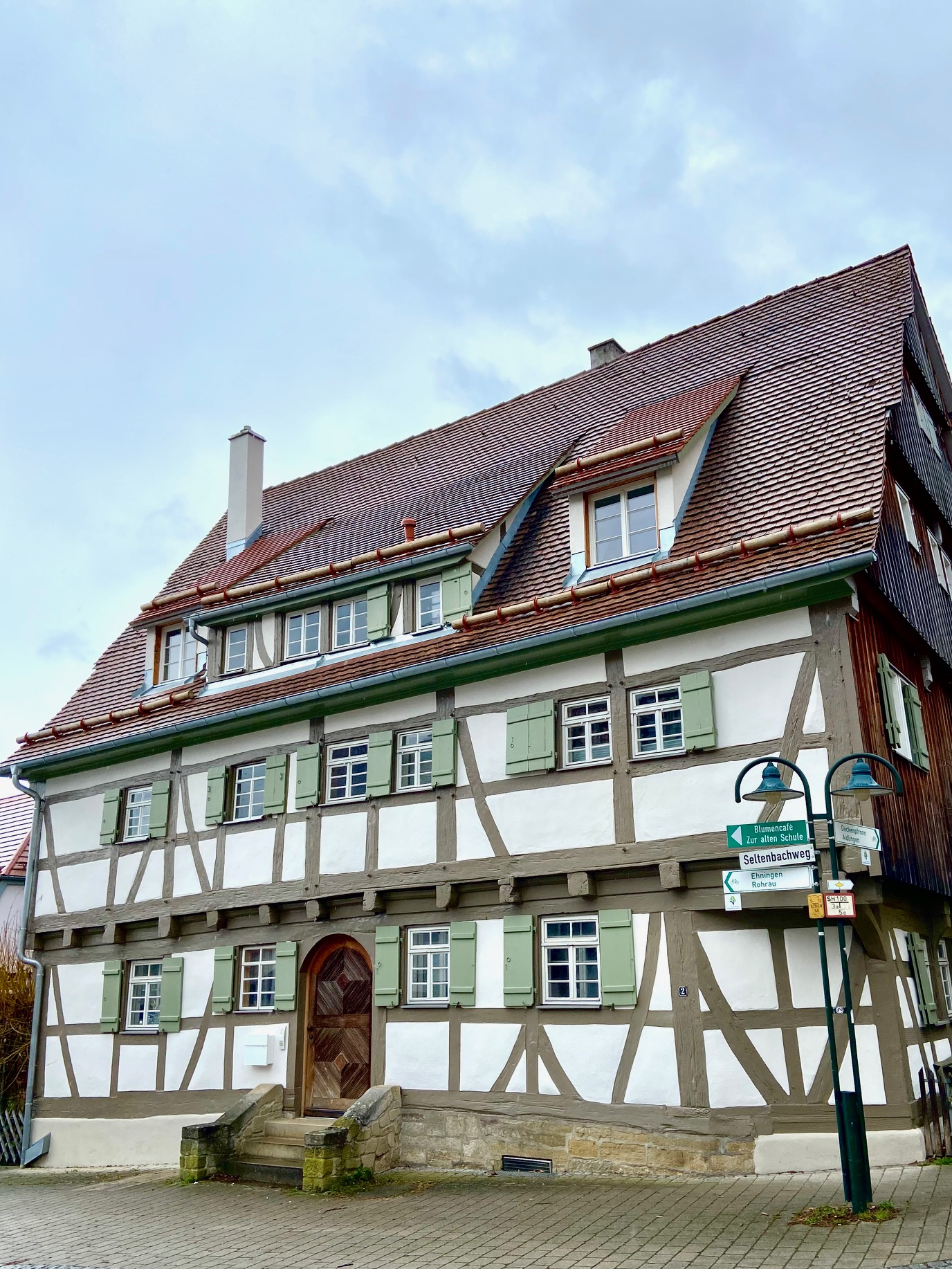
Historic Half-timbered Home

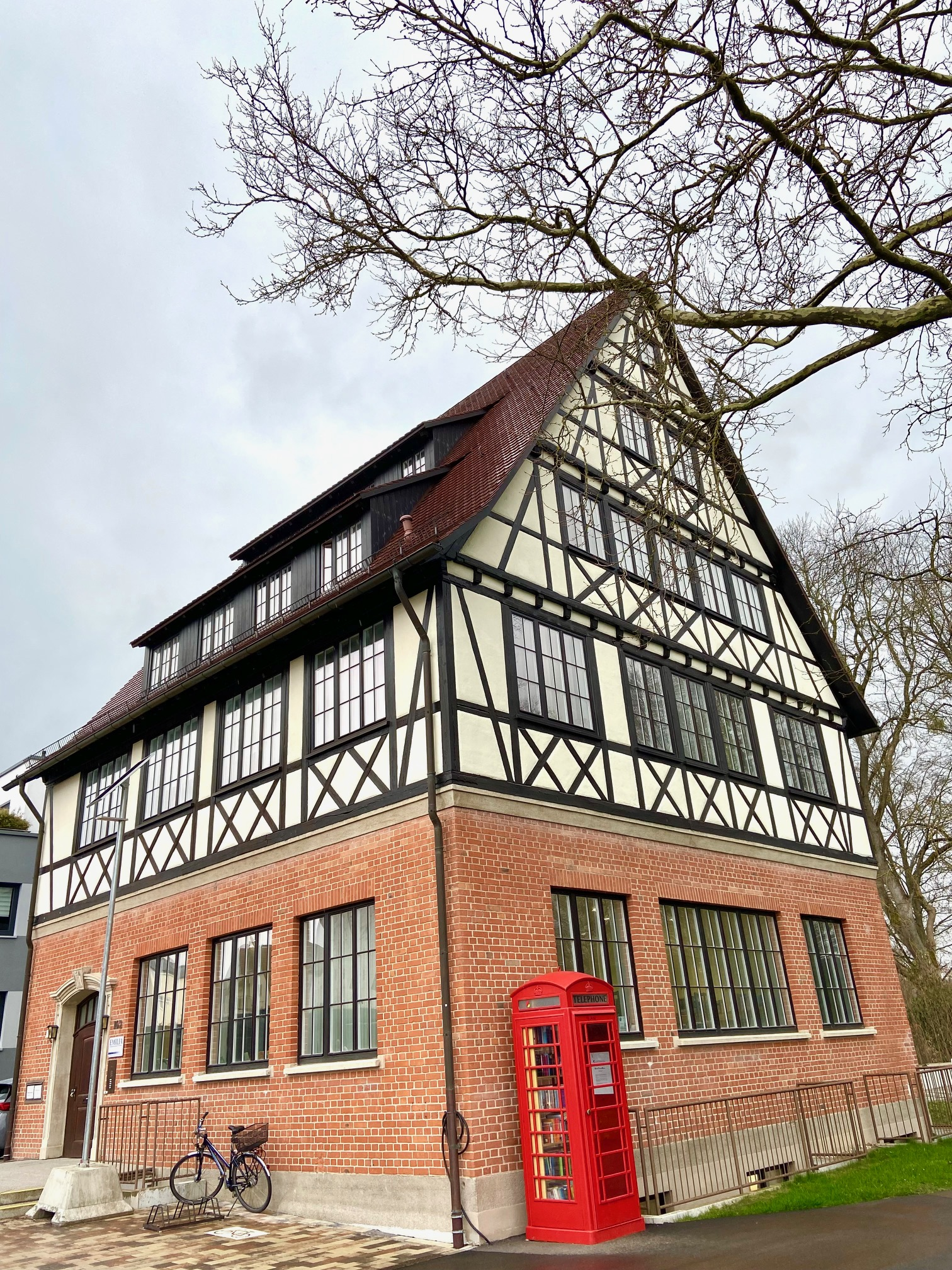
Town Library
