= Roringen =

Village in Germany

Coordinates: 51°34′N 10°01′E

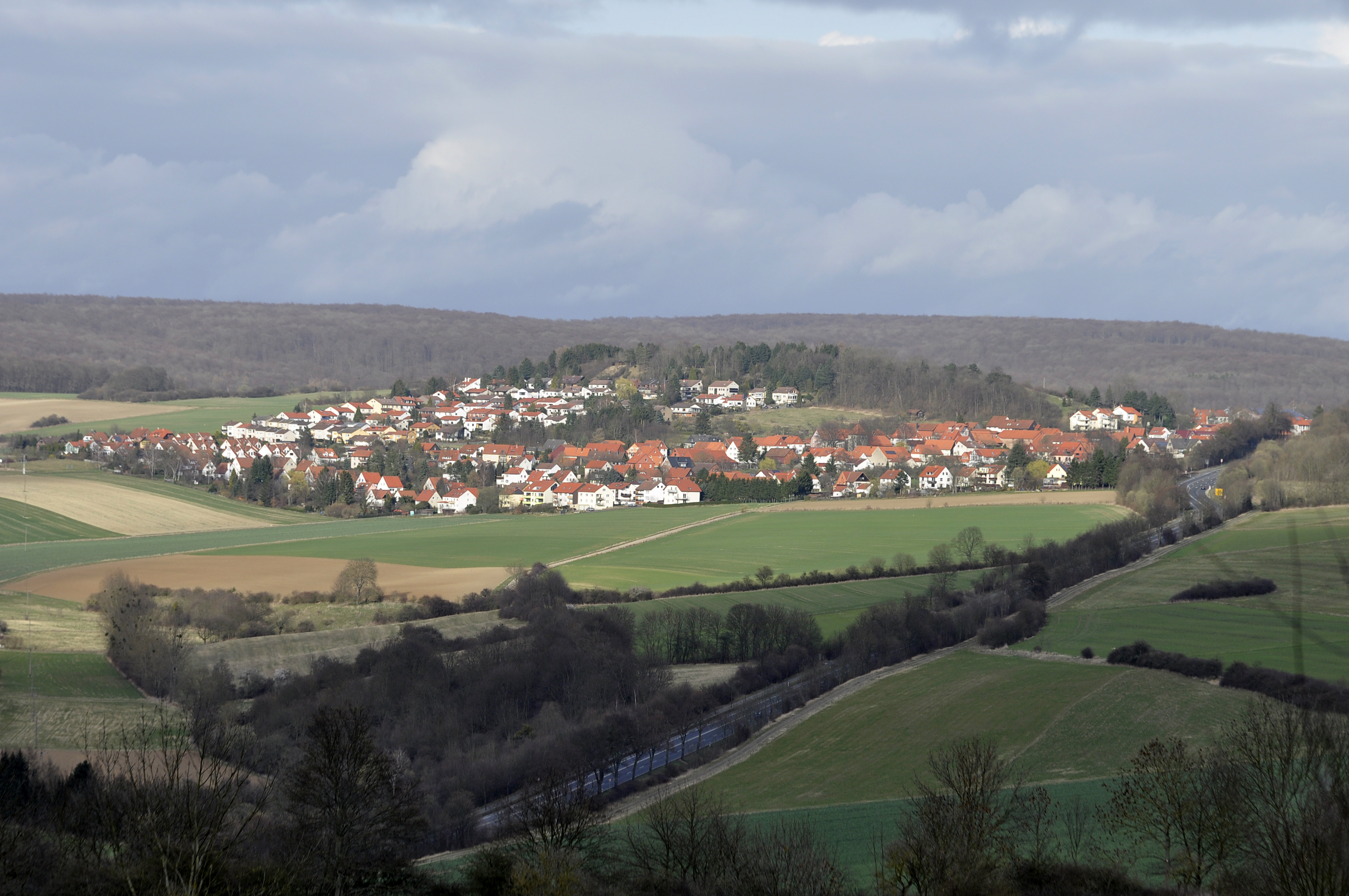
Roringen

Roringen (German pronunciation: [ˈʁoːʁɪŋən]) is a village in the borough of Göttingen, Germany. High on a hill, it is separated from the city proper some 5 1/2 km to the south-west by farmlands and part of the Göttingen Forest.

== History ==
Etymology: Roringen means "settlement by the reed(s)".

Roringen is first mentioned in 1162, in a church document. In 1380, Roringen was sold to the City of Göttingen. During the often turbulent Late Middle Ages and the sixteenth century, the village suffered the depredations of war, being largely destroyed on three occasions (1466, 1485 and 1552). In 1582, the village was designated a Ratsdorf, and a militia and police body were established. In 1973, Roringen's political independence ended, and it became a part of the borough of Göttingen.

== Geography ==
- Elevation: 338 m. amsl
- Coordinates:51°34' N 10°1' E

The village abuts a large mixed deciduous forest on Menzelberg (hill) while dropping off onto farm-land in the Luttertal (valley) below, in the direction of Göttingen proper. Across Highway 27 from Roringen lies the Göttinger Wald.

The underlying geological structure of the area is the regional limestone. Most of the Roringen district is considered a biotope of regional significance, according to the Göttingen government's internet site.

The village consists of the old part and new construction west and north of the village core begun in the second half of the twentieth century. Currently, the development of a new addition to the village on the south of Menzelberg is being debated.

== Demographics ==
- Population
  - 2005: 1,039
  - 1967: 628
  - 1939: about 300
- Households (2005): 438

== Government and politics ==
- Mayor: Alfred Rosenplänter
- Administrative offices: Verwaltungsstelle Geismar, Kerllsgasse 2, 37083 Göttingen

== Economics ==
Roringen retains its character as an independent farming village while also being a bedroom community for commuters that work in the city. Sugar beet and rape seed are among the crops cultivated.

== Public services and education ==
- The local fire department provides a number of services, including collecting paper for re-cycling and building, burning and monitoring the community's Easter Fire.
- Library: Lange Str. 22; only open on Tuesday afternoons.
- The TV Roringen's Sporthaus can be rented for social events.
- Regular commuter bus service from the Göttingen central bus station (ZOB) to Roringen Rottenanger takes about 1/2 to 3/4 of an hour (busses 91, 170).
- There is one nursery school in the community.
- There is a young children's playground.

== Social aspects ==
There are two sports clubs, TV Roringen 1928 (a general sports club that also offers lessons) and SV Roringen (a soccer club that plays on the Drakenberg field). Stallarte is an organization that fosters art.

== Religion ==
The largely Lutheran village and near-by Herberhausen are served by the over 750-year-old Lutheran church, St. Martins-Kirche in Roringen.

== Architecture ==
The vast majority of the structures in the village are single- or double-household residences built in the typical styles of the region. They are generally white- or cream-walled (houses in the old part of the village being half-timbered structures) with red-tile roofs.

The church, built in 1254, is the oldest structure in the village. Its grounds wall, built around 1440, was recently restored.

The Roringer Warte, an outlying defense/watch tower for Göttingen built in 1408 at an elevation of about 325 m amsl, lies in the woods outside the village proper, in the direction of Waake. Today, it is a historic monument that is a bit in ruins.
