= Heinrich Christian Eisenbrandt =

Manufacturer of brass and woodwind instruments

- Born: 1790; Göttingen, Germany
- Died: 1860 (aged 69–70) Baltimore, Maryland
- Occupations: Manufacturer of brass and woodwind instruments

Heinrich Christian Eisenbrandt (H. C. Eisenbrandt) was a German-born manufacturer of brass and woodwind instruments. He was born in Göttingen, Germany, and moved to Philadelphia in 1811, followed by Baltimore in 1819. His factory produced clarinets, fifes, drums, basset-horns, bassoons, oboes, flutes, flageolets and brass instruments. He was praised for technical innovations in the valves of the saxhorn, and owned two patents used for brass instruments. He also invented a method of drilling fife bores that allowed him to underbid his competition, and he may have been the first woodwind maker to use rosewood.

Eisenbrandt died in Baltimore, Maryland in 1860. His son, H.W.R. Eisenbrandt, subsequently continued the family business, which lasted until 1949.
