= Göttingen =

City in Lower Saxony, Germany

Göttingen Chöttingen (Low German)
- City
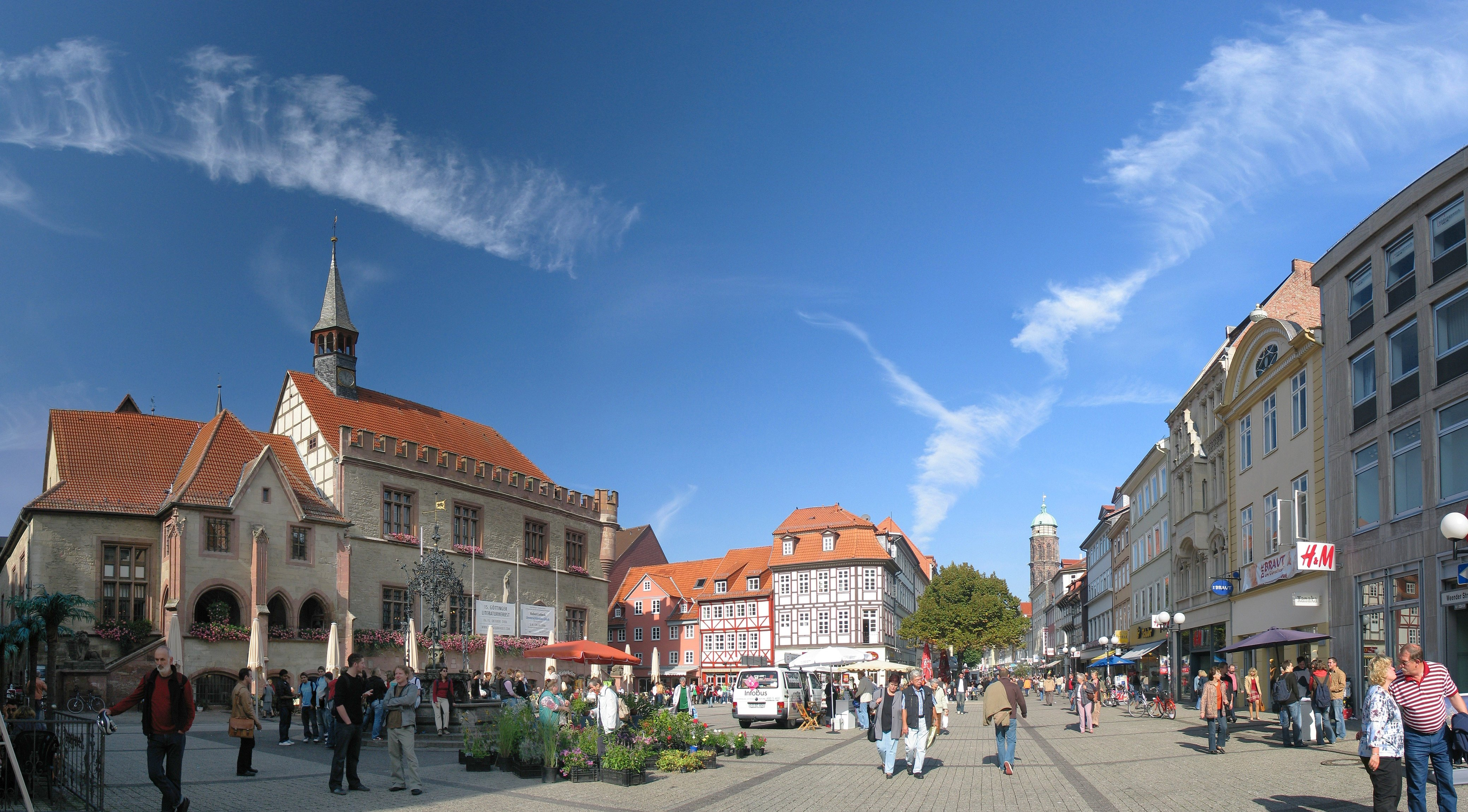
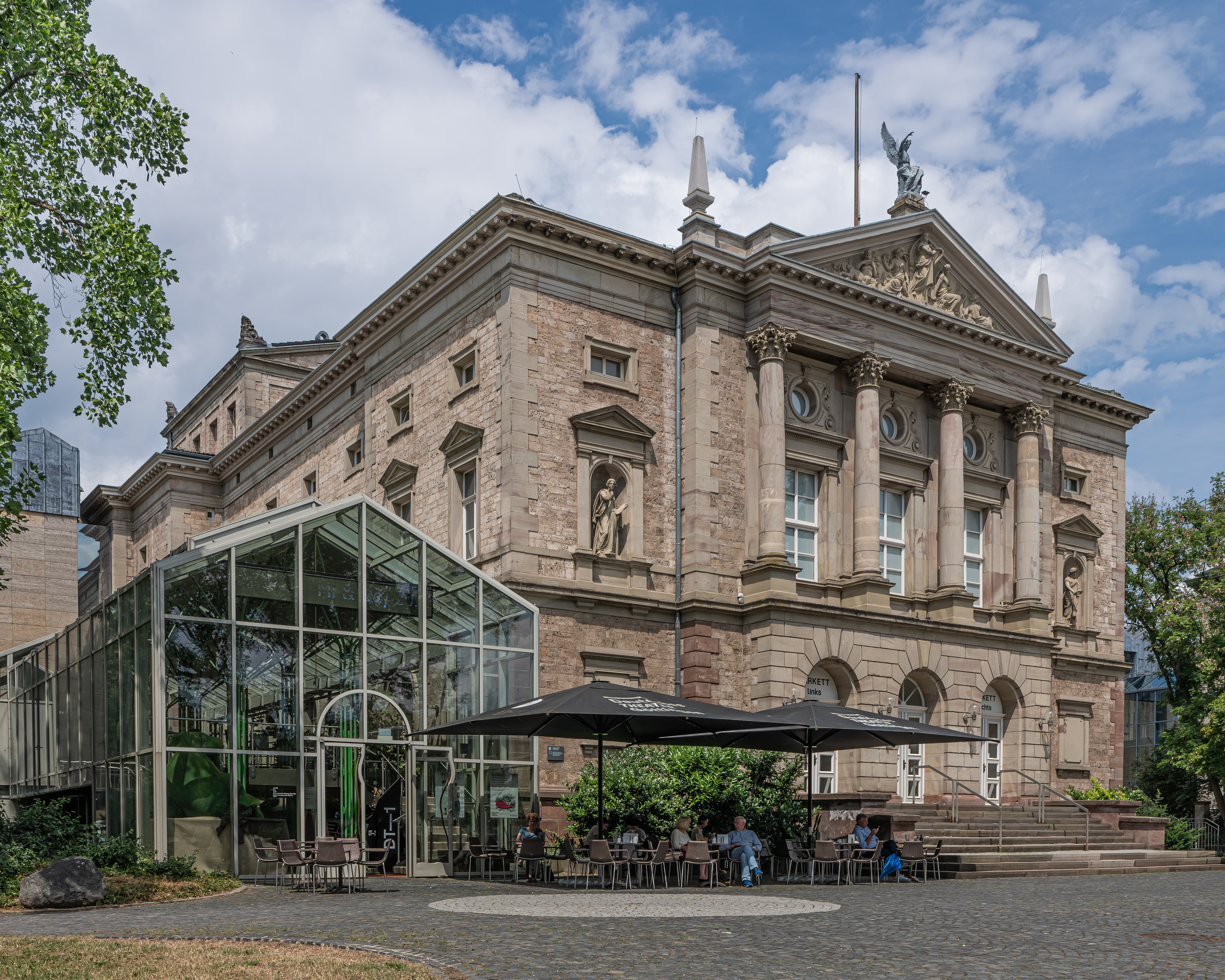
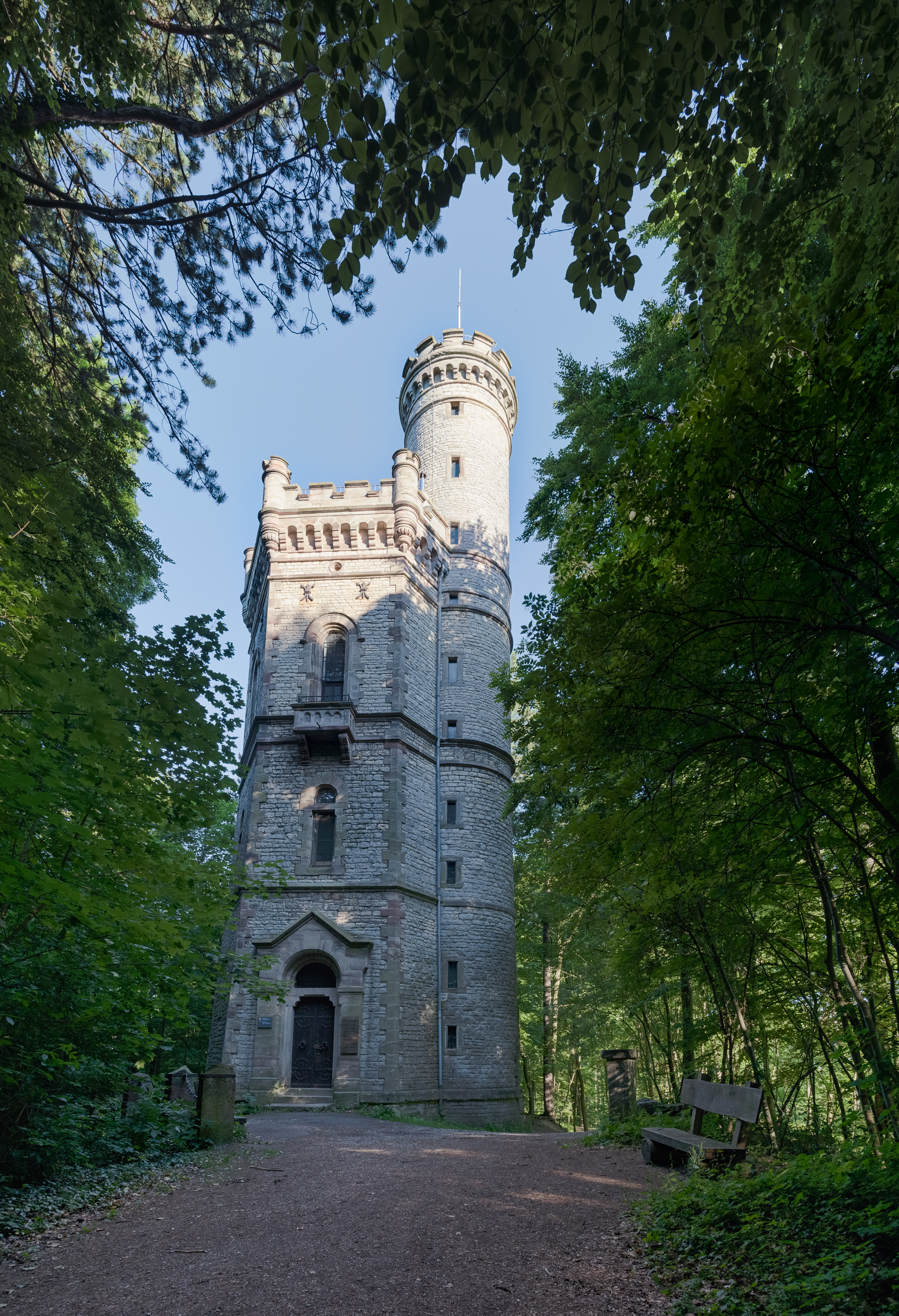
- Gänseliesel fountain and pedestrian zone Deutsches Theater Bismarckturm

- Flag Coat of arms

- Location of Göttingen within Göttingen district
- Interactive map of Göttingen
- Location within Germany Location within Lower Saxony
- Coordinates: 51°32′02″N 09°56′08″E
- Country: Germany
- State: Lower Saxony
- District: Göttingen
- First mentioned: 953
- Subdivisions: 18 districts

Government
  - Mayor (2026–31): Onyeka Oshionwu (Greens)

Area
  - Total: 116.93 km^{2} (45.15 sq mi)
- Elevation: 150 m (490 ft)

Population (2025-12-31)
  - Total: 130,521
  - Density: 1,116.2/km^{2} (2,891.0/sq mi)
- Time zone: UTC+01:00 (CET)
  - Summer (DST): UTC+02:00 (CEST)
- Postal codes: 37001–37085
- Dialling codes: 0551
- Vehicle registration: GÖ
- Website: www.goettingen.de

Göttingen (/ˈɡɜːtɪŋən/, US also /ˈɡɛt-/; German: [ˈɡœtɪŋən]; Low German: Chöttingen) is a university city in Lower Saxony, central Germany, the capital of the eponymous district. The River Leine runs through it. According to the 2022 German census, the population of Göttingen was 124,548.

== Overview ==
The origins of Göttingen lay in a village called Gutingi, first mentioned in a document in 953 AD. The city was founded northwest of this village, between 1150 and 1200 AD, and adopted its name. In medieval times the city was a member of the Hanseatic League and hence a wealthy town.

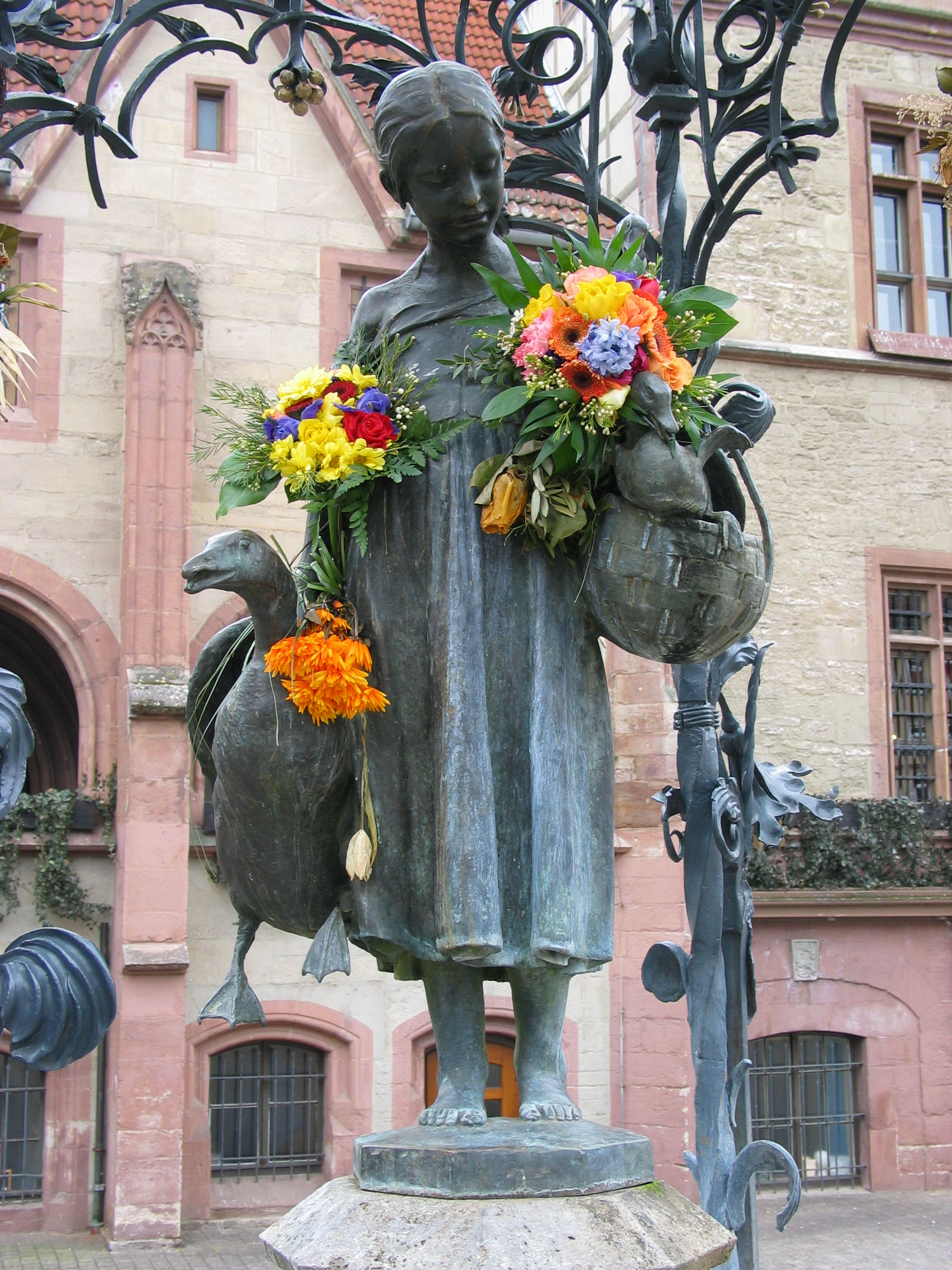
Landmark Gänseliesel fountain at the main market

Today, Göttingen is famous for its old university (Georgia Augusta, or "Georg-August-Universität"), which was founded in 1734 (first classes in 1737) and became the most visited university of Europe. In 1837, seven professors protested against the absolute sovereignty of the kings of Hanover; they lost their positions, but became known as the "Göttingen Seven". Its alumni include some well-known historical figures: the Brothers Grimm, Heinrich Ewald, Wilhelm Eduard Weber and Georg Gervinus. Also, German chancellors Otto von Bismarck and Gerhard Schröder attended law school at the Göttingen University. Karl Barth held his first professorship here. Some of the most famous mathematicians in history, Carl Friedrich Gauss, Bernhard Riemann and David Hilbert, were professors at Göttingen.

Like other university towns, Göttingen has developed its own quaint traditions. On the day they are awarded their doctorate degrees, students are drawn in handcarts from the Great Hall to the Gänseliesel-Fountain in front of the Old Town Hall. There they have to climb the fountain and kiss the statue of the Gänseliesel (goose girl). This practice is actually forbidden, but the law is not enforced. The statue is considered the most kissed girl in the world.

Nearly untouched by Allied bombing in World War II, the inner city of Göttingen is now an attractive place to live with many shops, cafes and bars. For this reason, many university students live in the inner city and give Göttingen a youthful feel. In 2003, 45% of the inner city population was between 18 and 30 years of age.

Commercially, Göttingen is noted for its production of optical and precision-engineered machinery, being the seat of the light microscopy division of Carl Zeiss, Inc., and a main site for Sartorius AG which specialises in bio-technology and measurement equipment—the region around Göttingen advertises itself as "Measurement Valley".

Unemployment in Göttingen was 12.6% in 2003, and is currently 6.6% (August 2026). The city's railway station to the west of the city centre is on Germany's main north–south railway.

== History ==
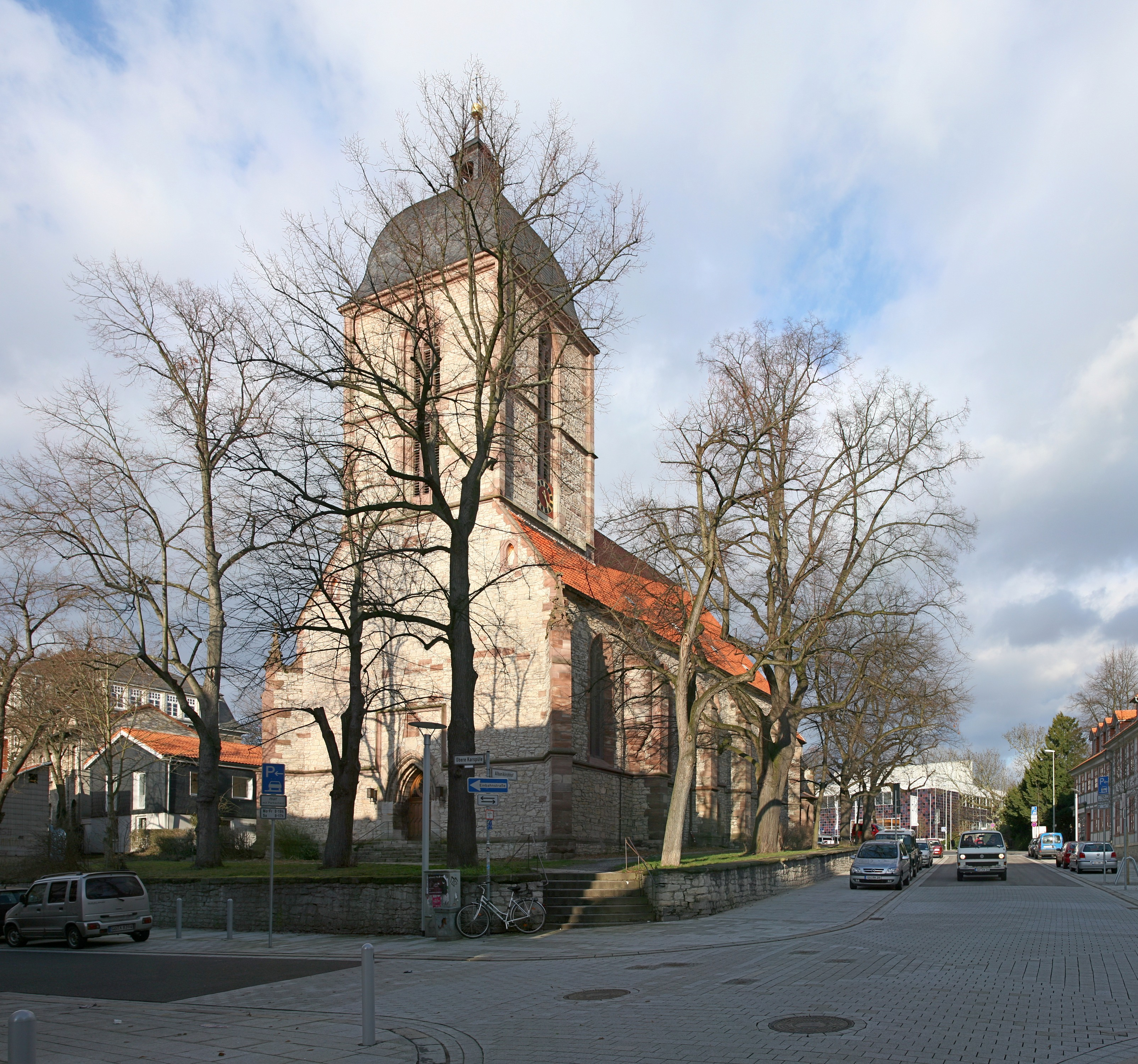
St. Alban's Church today

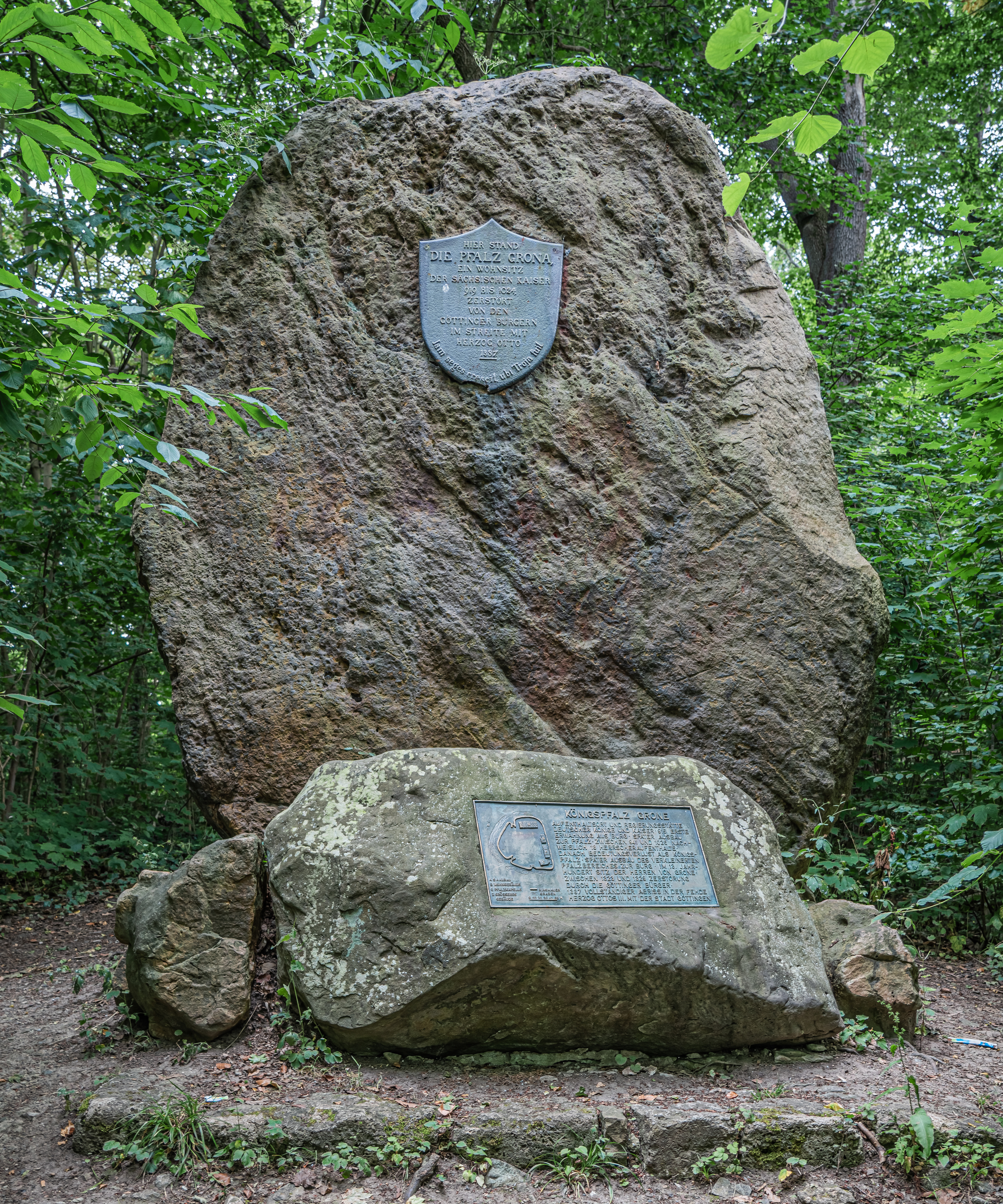
Memorial at Grona fortress site

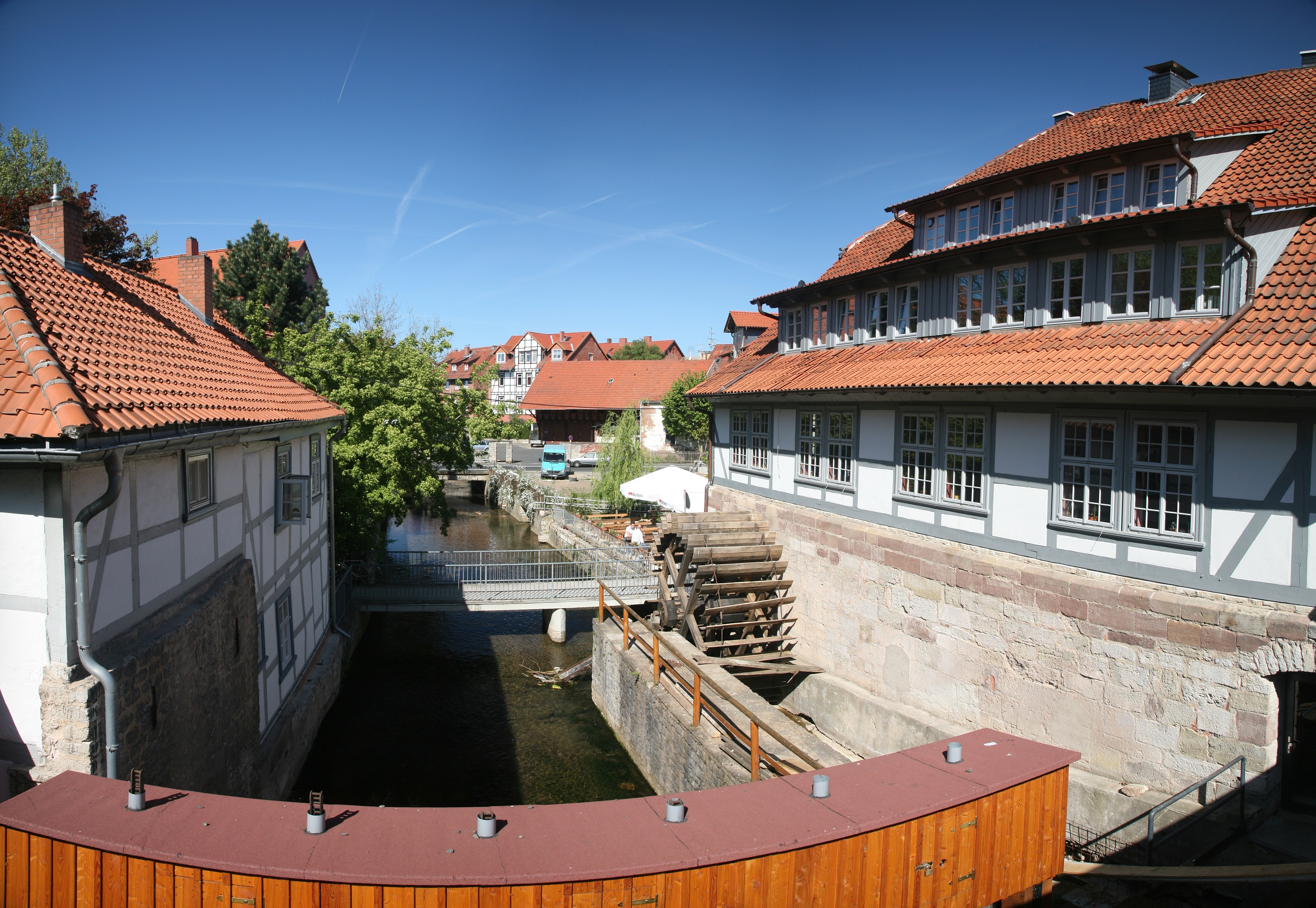
Watermill from early 13th century

=== Early history ===
The origins of Göttingen can be traced back to a village named Gutingi to the immediate south-east of the present city. The name of the village probably derives from a small stream, called the Gote, that once flowed through it. Since the ending -ing denoted "living by", the name can be understood as "along the Gote". Archaeological evidence points towards a settlement as early as the 7th century. It is first historically mentioned in a document by the Holy Roman Emperor Otto I in 953 AD, in which he gives some of his belongings in the village to the Moritz monastery in Magdeburg. Archaeological findings point to extensive commercial relations with other regions and a developed craftsmanship in this early period.

=== Imperial palace of Grona ===
In its early days, Gutingi was overshadowed by Grona, historically documented from the year 915 AD as a newly built fortress, lying opposite Gutingi on a hill west of the River Leine. It was subsequently used as an Ottonian imperial palace, with 18 visits of kings and emperors documented between 941 and 1025 AD. The last Holy Roman emperor to use the fortress of Grona (said to have been fond of the location), Heinrich II (1002–1024), also had a church built in the neighbouring Gutingi, dedicated to Saint Alban. The current church building that occupies this site, the St. Albani Church, was built in 1423.

The fortress then lost its function as a palace in 1025, after Henry II died there, having retreated to it in ill health. It was subsequently used by the lords of Grone. The fortress was destroyed by the citizens of Göttingen between 1323 and 1329, and finally razed to the ground by Duke Otto I during his feuds with the city of Göttingen in 1387.

=== Foundation of the town ===
With time, a trading settlement started to form at the river crossing of the Leine to the west of the village, from which it took its name. It is this settlement that was eventually given city rights. The original village remained recognisable as a separate entity until about 1360, at which time it was incorporated within the town's fortification.

It is likely the present city was founded between 1150 and 1180, although the exact circumstances are not known. It is presumed that Henry the Lion, Duke of Saxony and Bavaria, founded it. The configuration of the streets in the oldest part of the town is in the shape of a pentagon, and it has been proposed that the inception of the town followed a planned design. At this time, the town was known by the name Gudingin or also Gotingen. Its inhabitants obeyed Welfish ownership and ruling rights, and the first Göttingen burghers are mentioned then, indicating that Göttingen was already organised as a true city. It was not, however, a Free Imperial City (German: Reichsstadt), but subject to the Welf dukes of Brunswick-Lüneburg. Henry the Elder (V) of Brunswick, eldest son of Henry the Lion and brother of the Holy Roman Emperor Otto IV, is given as the lord over Göttingen between 1201 and 1208. The original Welf residency in the town consisted of a farm building and the stables of the Welf dukes, which occupied the oldest part of the city's fortifications built prior to 1250. In its early days, Göttingen became involved in the conflicts of the Welfs with their enemies. The initial conflicts in the first decades of the 13th century benefited the burghers of Göttingen, who were able to use the political and military situation to be courted by various parties, thus forcing the Welf town lords to make certain compromises with the town. In a document from 1232, Duke Otto the Child restored to the citizens of Göttingen the rights that they had held at the time of his uncles Otto IV and Henry the Elder of Brunswick. These included privileges concerning self-governance of the town, protection of traders, and facilitating trade. At this time Göttingen possessed a city council of burghers. The names of council members are first given in a document from 1247.

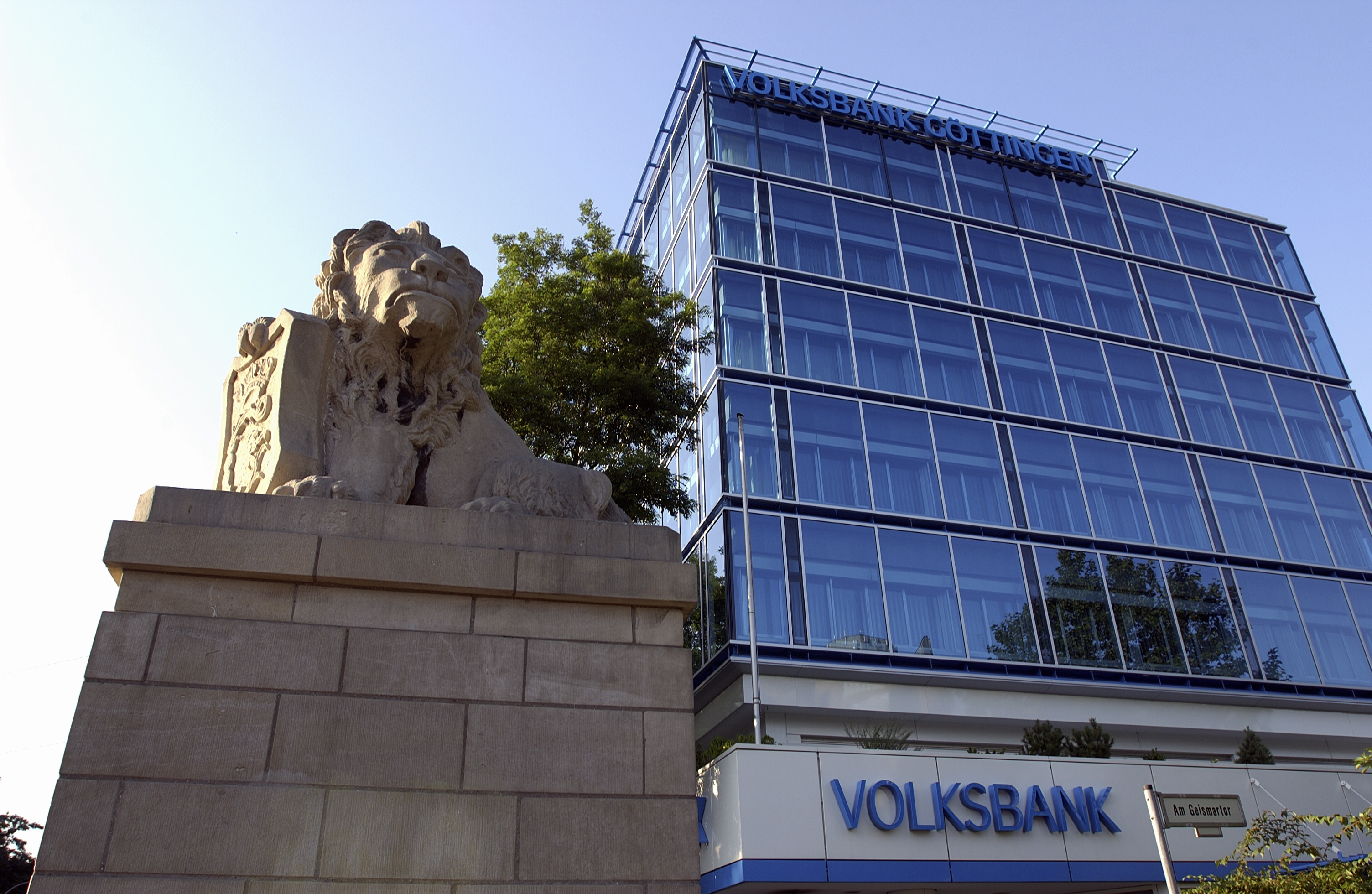
Geismar Tor

=== Expansion ===
The area secured by the initial fortification included the old market place, the old town hall, the two main churches, St. Johannes (St John's) and St. Jacobi (St. James's), the smaller church St. Nikolai (St. Nicholas's), as well as the large Weender Straße, Groner Straße and Rote Straße (red street). Outside the fortification in front of the Geismar city gate lay the old village with the Church of St. Alban, which was subsequently known as Geismarer altes Dorf (old Geismar village). This village was only to a limited extent under Welfish control and thus could not be included in the town's privileges and fortifications.

The town was initially protected by a rampart, as of the late 13th century, then also by walls on top of the mound-like ramparts. Of these, only one tower with a short stretch of the wall survives in the Turmstraße (tower street). This protected area included maximally 600 by 600 metres (2,000 by 2,000 ft), or about 25 hectares (62 acres). This made it smaller than contemporary Hanover, but larger than the neighbouring Welfish towns of Northeim, Duderstadt and Hann. Münden.

The Gote stream that flowed south of the walls of the town was connected to the River Leine via a channel at about this time and the waterway has since been known as the Leine Canal.

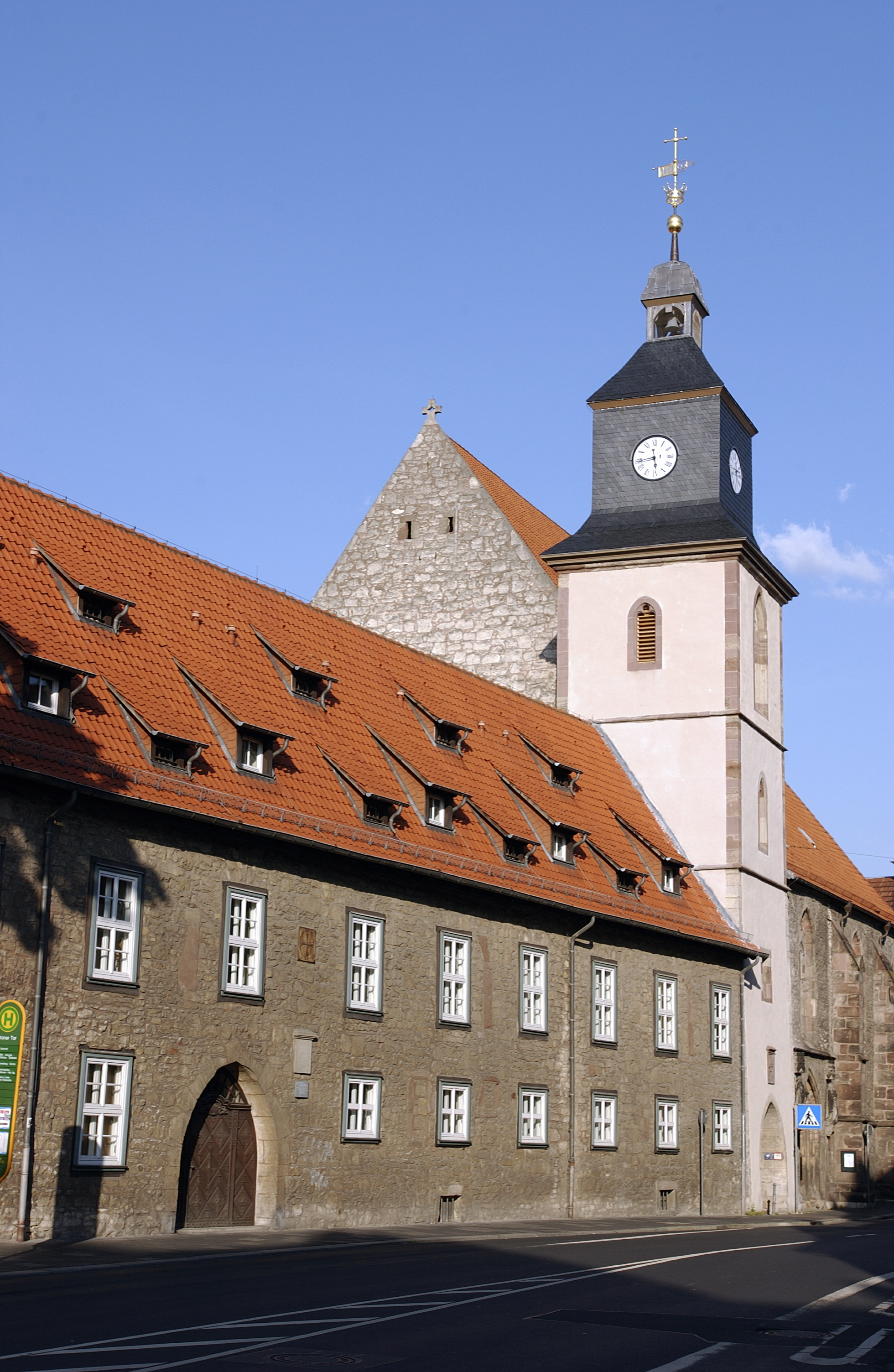
Marienkirche

After the death of Otto the Child in 1257, his sons Albert I of Brunswick (the Great) and Johann inherited their father's territories. Duke Albrecht I governed for his brother, a minor, at first. Subsequently, the brothers agreed to divide the territory between themselves in 1267, effective 1269. The city of Göttingen went to Albert I, and was inherited by his son Duke Albert II "the Fat" in 1286. Albert II chose Göttingen as his residence and moved into the Welf residency, which he rebuilt into a fortress known as the Ballerhus, after which the Burgstraße (fortress street) is named.

Albert II attempted to gain further control over the economically and politically rapidly growing town by founding a new town (German: Neustadt) west of the original town, across the Leine Canal and outside of the Groner City Gate. This competing settlement consisted of a single street, no more than 73 metres (80 yd) long, with houses on either side of the street. The Duke, however, could not prevent Göttingen's westward expansion nor the success of the Göttingen City Council in effectively checking any hope of economic development in the Neustadt. The St. Marien Church (St. Mary's) was built to the south of the Neustadt which, together with all adjoining farm buildings, was given to the Teutonic Knights in 1318.

After the failure of the new town, the city council bought up the uncomfortable competition to the west in 1319 for three hundred Marks, and obtained a promise from the Duke that he would not erect any fortress within a mile of the town.

Two monasteries were also founded on the edge of the town at the end of the 13th century. To the east, in the area of today's Wilhelmsplatz, a Franciscan monastery was built as early as 1268, according to the city chronicler Franciscus Lubecus. Since the Franciscans walked barefoot as part of their vow of poverty, they were known colloquially as the barefoot people, hence the name Barfüßerstraße (Barefoot People's Street) for the road that led to the monastery. In 1294, Albert the Fat permitted the founding of a Dominican monastery along the Leine Canal opposite the Neustadt, for which the Paulinerkirche (Pauline church), completed in 1331, was constructed.

Jews settled in Göttingen in the late 13th century. On 1 March 1289, the Duke gave the City Council permission to allow the first Jew, Moses, to settle inside the town limits. The subsequent Jewish population lived predominantly close to St. James's Church on the Jüdenstraße.

=== Growth and independence ===
After Albert the Fat's death in 1318, Göttingen passed to Otto the Mild (d. 1344), who ruled over both the "Principality of Göttingen" (German: Fürstentum Göttingen) and the territory of Brunswick. These dukes joined Göttingen and surrounding towns in battles against aristocratic knights in the surroundings of Göttingen, in the course of which the citizens of Göttingen succeeded in destroying the fortress of Grone between 1323 and 1329, as well as the fortress of Rosdorf. Since Otto the Mild died without leaving any children, his brothers Magnus and Ernest divided the land between themselves. Ernest I received Göttingen, the poorest of all the Welf principalities, which was to remain separate from Brunswick for a long time to come. At this time, the territory consisted of the regions formerly owned by Northeim, the towns of Göttingen, Uslar, Dransfeld, Münden, Gieselwerder and half of Moringen. Not much is known about the rule of Duke Ernest I, but it is generally assumed that he continued to fight against aristocratic knights.

Ernest I was succeeded after his death in 1367 by his son Otto I of Göttingen (the Evil; German: der Quade) (d. 1394), who initially lived in the city's fortress and attempted to make it a permanent Welf residency. The epithet the Evil came from Otto I's incessant feuds. Breaking with the policies of his predecessors, he frequently aligned himself with the aristocratic knights of the neighbourhood in battles against the cities, whose growing power disturbed him. Under Otto the Evil, Göttingen gained a large degree of independence. After losing control of the provincial court at the Leineberg to Göttingen in 1375, Otto finally tried to impose his influence on Göttingen in 1387, but with little success. In April 1387, Göttingen's citizens stormed and destroyed the fortress within the city's walls. In retaliation, Otto destroyed villages and farms in the town's surroundings. However, Göttingen's citizens gained a victory over the Duke's army in a battle between the villages of Rosdorf and Grone, under their leader Moritz of Uslar, forcing Otto to acknowledge the independence of the town and its surrounding properties. 1387 thus marks an important turning point in the history of the town. Göttingen's relative autonomy was further strengthened under Otto's successor Otto II "the One-eyed" of Göttingen (German: Cocles/der Einäugige), not least because the Welf line of Brunswick-Göttingen died out with Otto II, and the resulting questions surrounding his succession after his abdication in 1435 destabilized the regional aristocracy.

After Duke Otto I of Göttingen relinquished his jurisdiction over Jews to the town of Göttingen in the years 1369–70, conditions for Jews greatly deteriorated, and several bloody persecutions and evictions from the town followed. Between 1460 and 1599, no Jews lived in Göttingen at all.

The trend towards ever diminishing Welf influence over the town continued until the end of the 15th century, although the town officially remains a Welf property. Nevertheless, it is counted in some contemporaneous documents among the Imperial Free Cities.

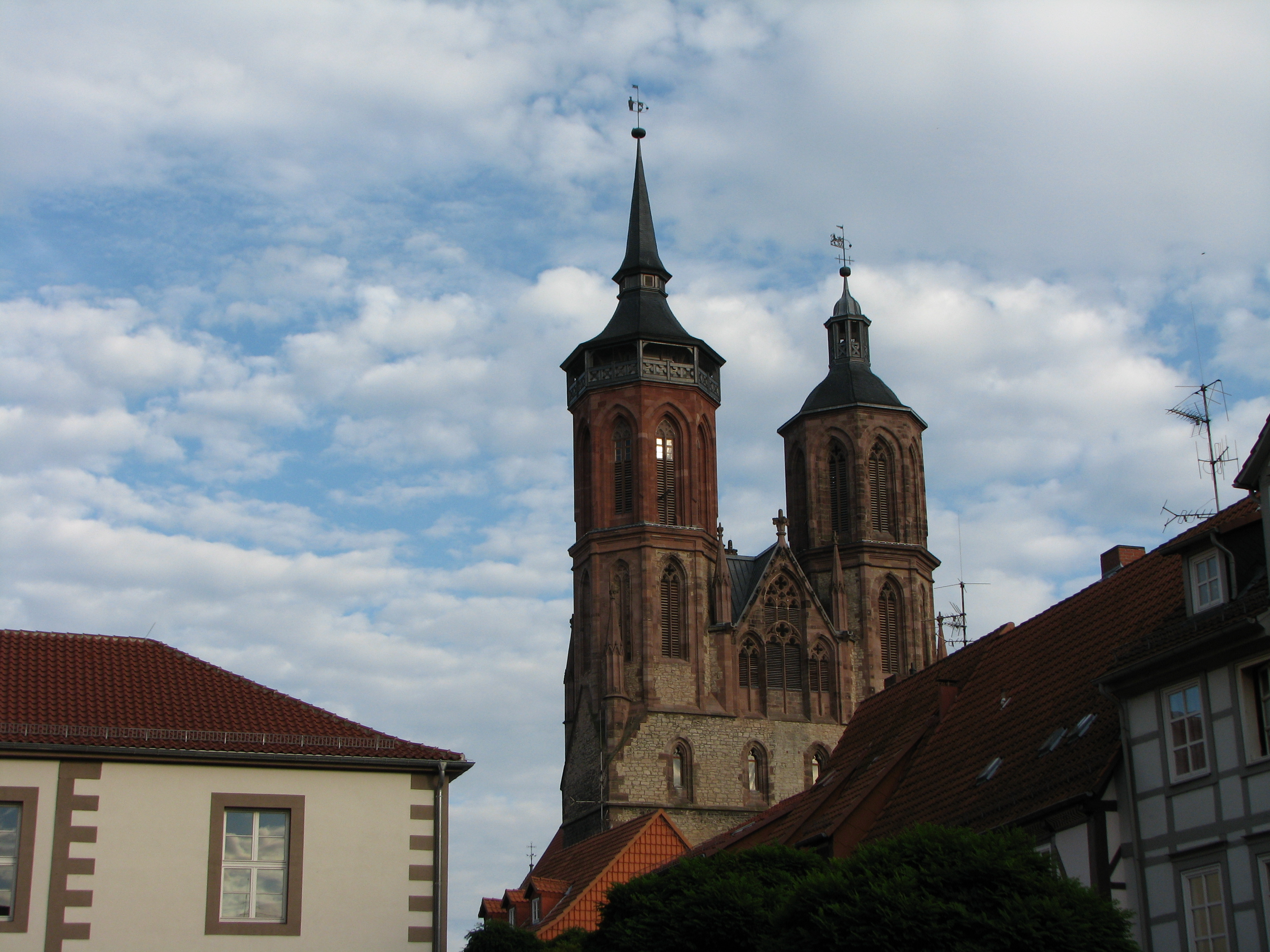
St. John's Church

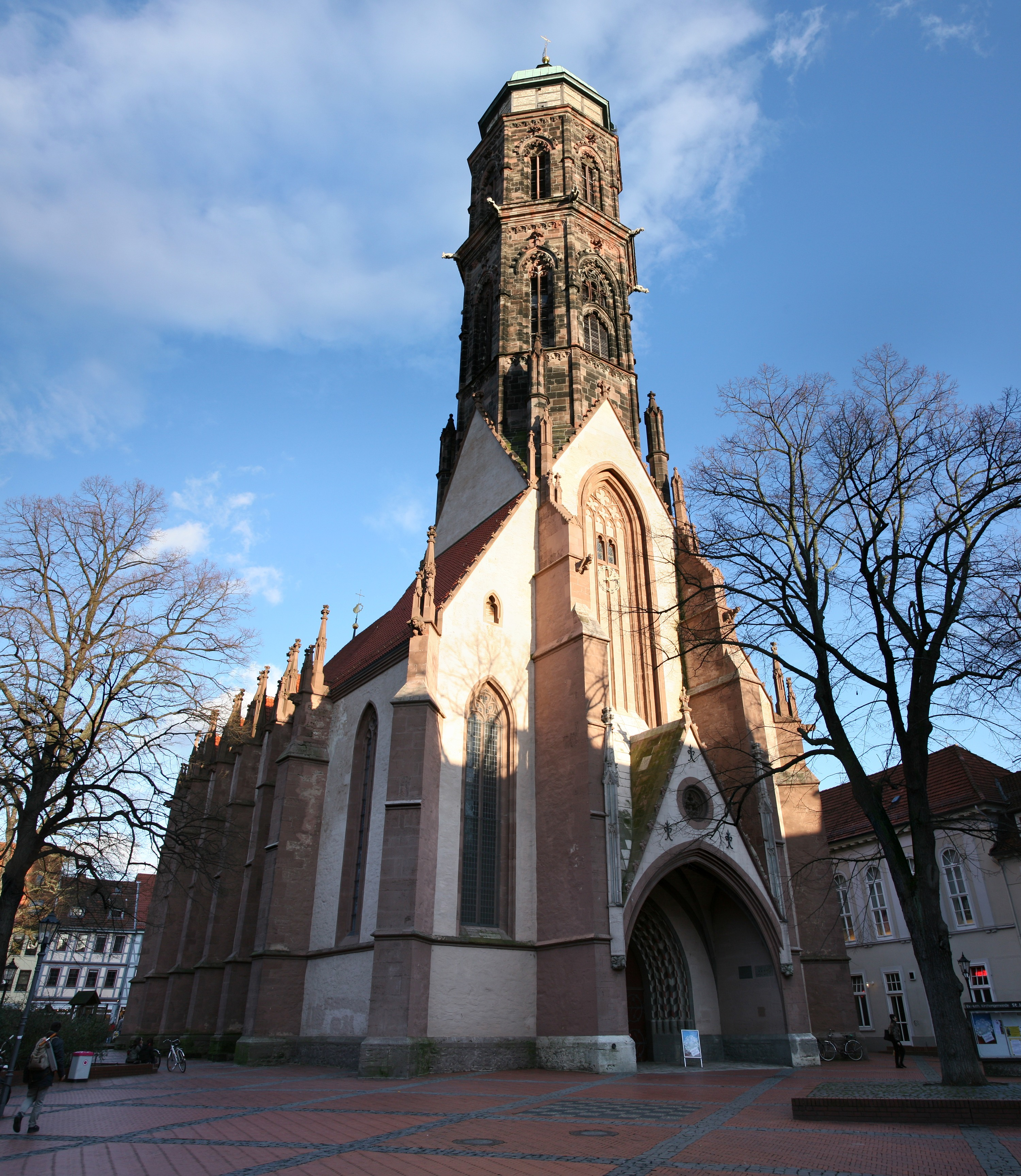
St. Jacobi's Church

The 14th and 15th centuries thus represent a time of political and economic power expansion, which is also reflected in the contemporary architecture. The expansion of the St. Johannis Church to a Gothic hall church began in the first half of the 14th century. As of 1330, a Gothic structure also replaced the smaller St Nikolai Church (St. Nicholas's). After completion of the work on St John's Church, the rebuilding of St James's Church was begun in the second half of the 14th century. The original, smaller church that preceded this building was probably initiated by Henry the Lion or his successor, and functioned as a fortress chapel to the city fortress that lay immediately behind it. The representative old town hall was built between 1366 and 1444.

Around 1360, the town's fortifications were rebuilt to encompass now also the new town and the old village. In the course of this construction work, the four city gates were moved farther out, and the town's area grew to roughly 75 hectares (190 acres). The city council forged alliances with surrounding towns, and Göttingen joined the Hanseatic League in 1351 (see below). Göttingen also gained Grona (currently Grone) and several other surrounding villages in the Leine Valley.

The reason for the progressive increase in importance in the late Middle Ages was the growing economic strength of the town. This depended largely on its good connections with the north–south trade route, particularly the north–south trade route that followed the Leine Valley, which greatly aided the local textile industry in particular. Next to the guild of linen weavers, the guild of wool weavers gained in importance. The wool for the weaving originated in the immediate surroundings of the town, where up to 3000 sheep and 1500 lambs were kept. Woollen cloth was successfully exported all the way to the Netherlands and Lübeck. From 1475, textile production was augmented by the addition of new weavers who brought novel weaving techniques to Göttingen and consolidated the position of the town as a textile exporter for three generations. Only at the end of the 16th century did the decline of the local textile industry occur when Göttingen could not compete anymore with cheap English textiles.

Göttingen's traders also profited from the important trade route between Lübeck and Frankfurt am Main. Göttingen's market became important beyond the region. Traders from other regions would come in great numbers four times a year. Göttingen also joined the Hanseatic League, to the first meeting of which it was invited in 1351. Göttingen's relationship with the Hanseatic League remained distant, however. As an inland town, Göttingen enjoyed the economic connections of the League, but it did not want to get involved in the politics of the alliance. Göttingen only became a paying member in 1426, and left as early as 1572.

=== Loss of independence to the present day ===
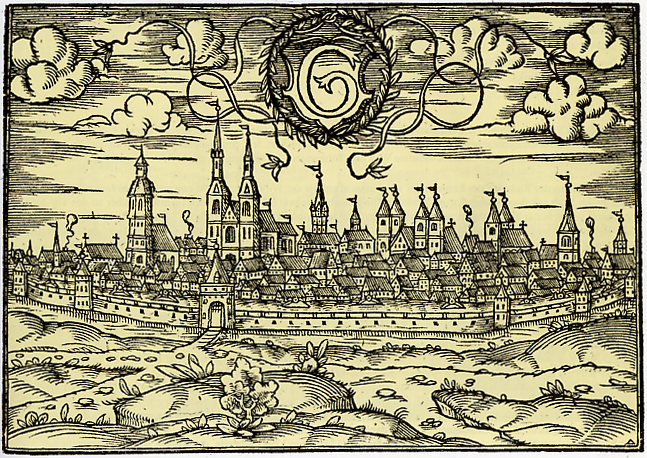
Woodcut showing the town in the year 1585 as viewed from the west

After several dynastic splits and shifts in power that followed the death of Otto the One-Eyed, Duke Eric I "the Elder", Prince of Calenberg, annexed the principality of Göttingen, which became an integral part of the Principality of Calenberg. The town refused to pay homage to Eric I in 1504, and as a result, Eric I had the Emperor Maximilian I, declare the town of Göttingen outlawed. The subsequent tensions economically weakened Göttingen, leading to the town finally paying its homage to Eric I in 1512. Afterwards, the relationship between Eric and the town improved because of Eric's financial dependence on Göttingen.

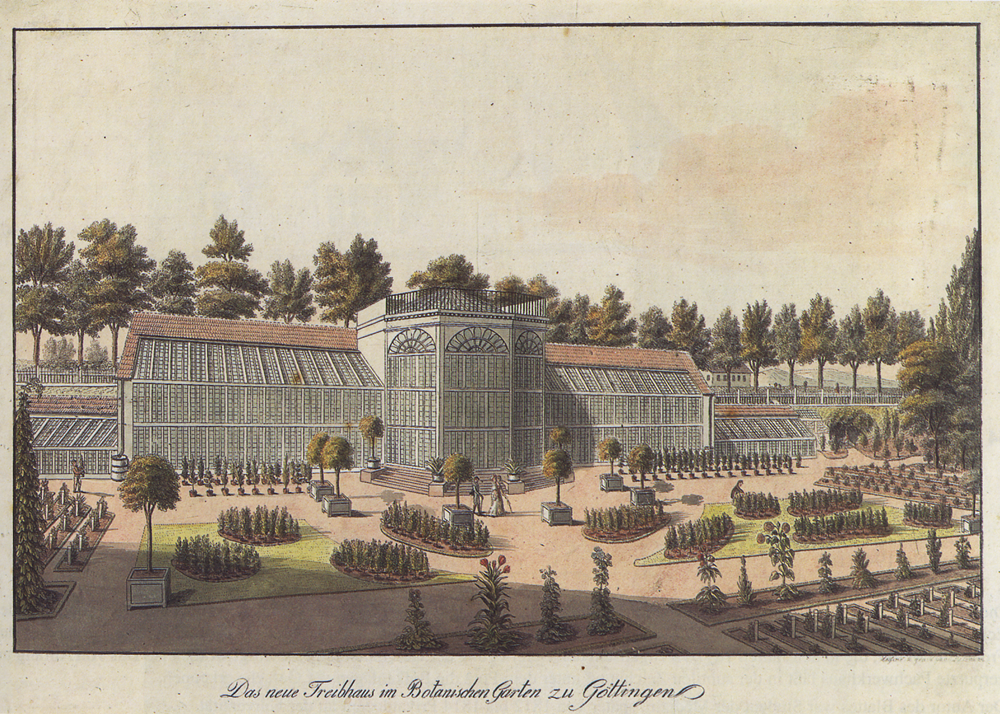
The new greenhouse for the academic botanic garden circa 1810

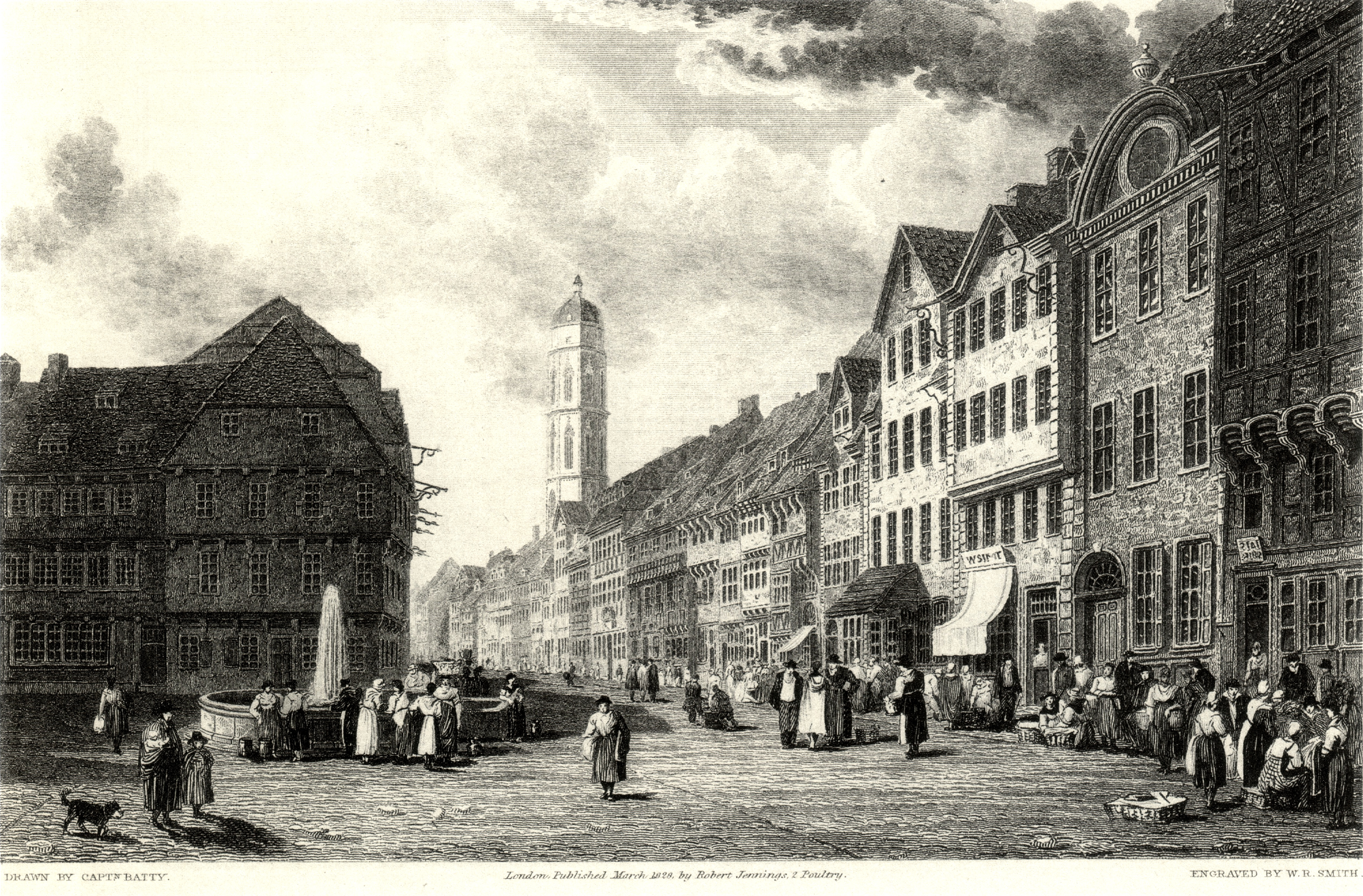
Market Place and Weender Strasse at Göttingen. Drawing by Robert Batty, engraved in 1828 by W. R. Smith

City map of Göttingen (1864)

In 1584 the city came into the possession of the dukes of Brunswick-Wolfenbüttel, also of the Welf dynasty, and in 1635 it passed to the house of Lüneburg, which ruled it thenceforth. In 1692 it was named as part of the indivisible territory Electoral State of Hanover (officially the Electorate of Brunswick-Lüneburg).

The University of Göttingen was founded in 1737 by George II Augustus, who was king of Great Britain and Ireland, Duke of Brunswick-Lüneburg and prince-elector of Hanover.

During the Napoleonic period, the city was briefly in the hands of the Prussia in 1806, turned over in 1807 to the newly created Napoleonic Kingdom of Westphalia, and returned to the State of Hanover in 1813 after Napoleon's defeat. In 1814 the prince-electors of Hanover were elevated to kings of Hanover and the Kingdom of Hanover was established. During the Austro-Prussian War (1866), the Kingdom of Hanover had attempted to maintain a neutral position. After Hanover voted in favour of mobilising confederation troops against Prussia on 14 June 1866, Prussia saw this as a just cause for declaring war. In 1868, the Kingdom of Hanover was dissolved and Göttingen became part of the Prussian Province of Hanover. The Province of Hanover was disestablished in 1946.

In 1854 the city was connected to the new Hanoverian Southern Railway. Today, Göttingen railway station is served by (ICE) high-speed trains on the Hanover–Würzburg high-speed line.

==== Nazi era (1933–1945) ====
During the 1930s, Göttingen housed the top math-physics faculty in the world, led by eight men, almost all Jews, who became known as the Göttingen eight. Their members included Leó Szilárd and Edward Teller. This faculty was not tolerable to the Reich, however, and the University of Göttingen suffered greatly as a result. The Göttingen eight were expelled, and these men were forced to emigrate to the West in 1938. Szilárd and Teller went on to become key members of the Manhattan Project team. Ironically, the Nazi insistence on "German physics" prevented German scientists from applying Albert Einstein's breakthrough insights to physics, a policy which stifled the further development of physics in Germany. After the end of World War II, the famous university had to be reorganised almost from scratch, especially in the physics, mathematics and chemistry departments, a process which has continued into the 21st century.

There was considerable support in the population of Göttingen for Hitler and Nazism from the start of the National Socialist era. As early as 1933 the Theaterplatz (Theatre Square) was renamed Adolf-Hitlerplatz, and by the end of World War II 70 streets had been renamed in reference to the Nazi regime or military topics. The absorption of Nazi culture into the everyday life of the citizens of Göttingen has been documented by historian David Imhoof. The synagogue in Göttingen was destroyed during Kristallnacht on 9 November 1938. Many of the Jews were killed in Nazi German extermination camps. Also, there was a concentration camp for adolescents in Moringen, which was not liberated until 1945.

During the widespread British, Canadian and American air raids on Nazi Germany, Göttingen suffered comparatively little damage. The city and its strategic marshalling yard was bombed a total of 8 times during the bombing of Göttingen, but only about 2.1% of the city ended up being destroyed when the war ended. Beginning in July 1944, the air raids were sometimes heavier, but these mainly hit the area of the main railway station last on 7 April 1945. The historic old town of Göttingen remained practically undamaged. The Junkernschänke, a historic half-timbered house, was destroyed during a 1945 air raid, and the exterior was not properly reconstructed until the 1980s. Two of the churches (Paulinerkirche and Johanniskirche) in the old town, and several buildings of the university, were heavily damaged. The Institute of Anatomy and 57 residential buildings, especially in Untere Masch Street in the centre of the city, were completely destroyed. Overall, only about 107 deaths were caused by the air raids, a comparatively small number. However, the neighbouring cities of Hanover and Brunswick experienced a much greater impact from the bombing raids. Kassel was destroyed several times.

Because the city had many hospitals, those hospitals had to take care of up to four thousand wounded Wehrmacht soldiers and airmen during World War II. Göttingen was also fortunate in that before troops of the U.S. Army arrived in Göttingen on 8 April 1945, all of the Wehrmacht's combat units had departed from this area, hence Göttingen experienced no heavy ground fighting, artillery bombardments or other major combat.

==== Modern history ====
The Göttingen Studios were a significant centre of film production in West Germany from 1948 to 1961. In a reform in 1973 the district of Göttingen was enlarged by incorporating the dissolved districts of Duderstadt and Hannoversch Münden.

== Cultural relevance ==
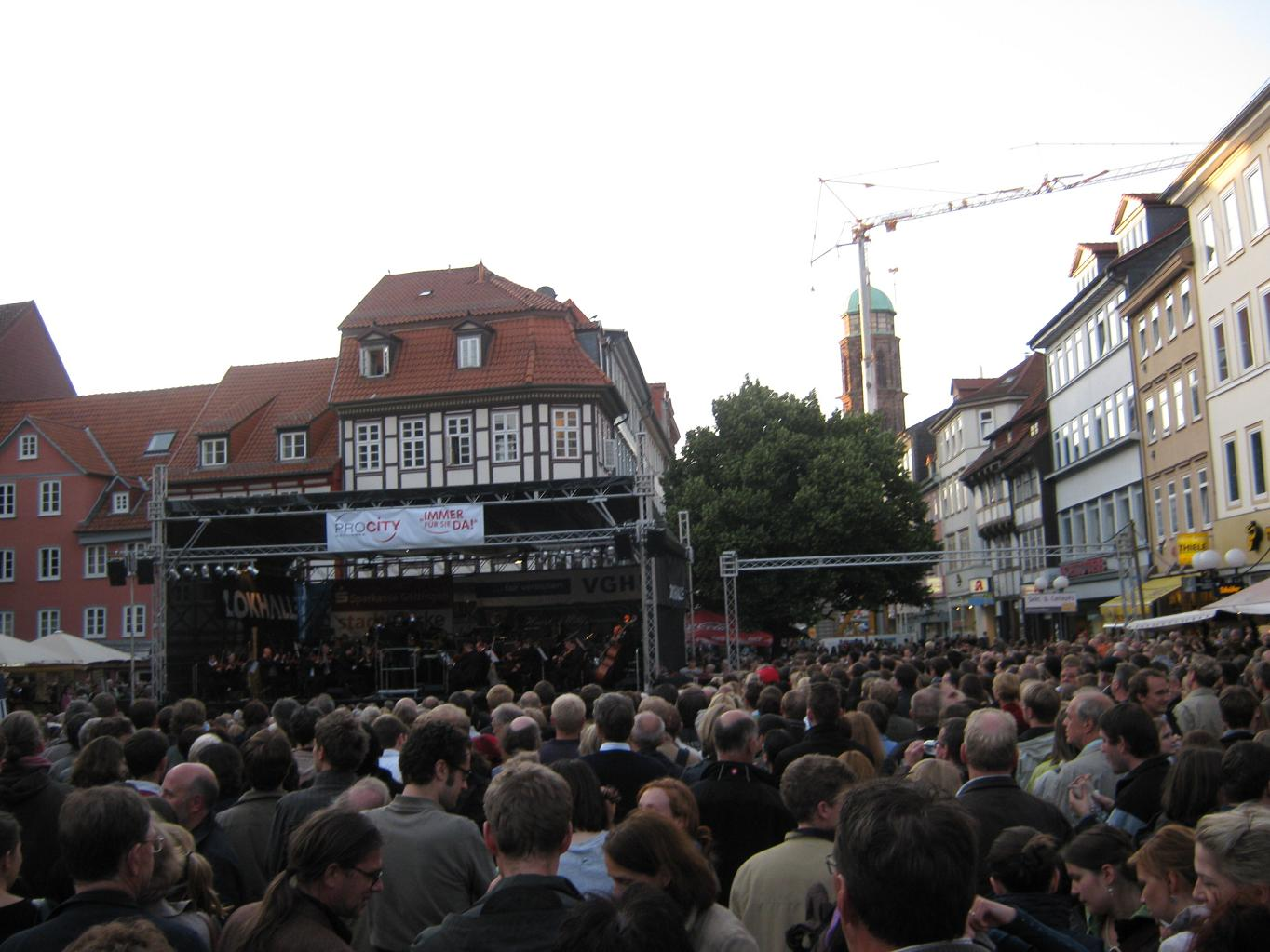
Göttingen Nacht der Kultur (Göttingen Cultural Night)

Prior to the period of German romanticism, a group of German poets that had studied at this university between 1772 and 1776, formed the Göttinger Hainbund or "Dichterbund" ('circle of poets'). Being disciples of Klopstock, they revived the folksong and wrote lyric poetry of the Sturm und Drang period. Their impact was essential on romanticism in the German-speaking area and on folklore in general.

Since the 1920s, the town has been associated with the revival of interest in the music of George Frideric Handel. The Göttingen International Handel Festival is held each summer with performances in the Stadthalle Göttingen and a number of churches.

The city is home to several ensembles such as the Göttinger Sinfonie Orchester or the Göttingen Boys' Choir, which are also performing nationwide.

In the mid-1960s, the song named after the city by the French singer Barbara created a considerable popular impetus towards post-war Franco-German reconciliation. A street in the city – Barbarastraße – is named after her.

Because of the city's long association with academics and scholarly journals, Göttingen has acquired the motto Die Stadt, die Wissen schafft. The phrase is a pun: Die Stadt der Wissenschaft means 'the city of science,' Die Stadt, die Wissen schafft (identical pronunciation apart from der ~ die) means 'the city that creates knowledge.'

Göttingen is a part of a tourist attraction in Germany, the German Fairy Tale Route (German: Deutsche Märchenstraße).

== Incorporations ==
The following communities were incorporated in the city of Göttingen:

- 1963: Herberhausen
- 1964: Geismar, Grone, Nikolausberg, and Weende
- 1973: Deppoldshausen, Elliehausen, Esebeck, Groß Ellershausen, Hetjershausen, Holtensen, Knutbühren, and Roringen

== Climate ==
Climate data for Göttingen (1991–2020 normals)
Month	Jan	Feb	Mar	Apr	May	Jun	Jul	Aug	Sep	Oct	Nov	Dec	Year
Mean daily maximum °C (°F)	3.9 (39.0)	5.2 (41.4)	9.4 (48.9)	14.7 (58.5)	18.6 (65.5)	21.6 (70.9)	24.0 (75.2)	24.1 (75.4)	19.4 (66.9)	13.9 (57.0)	8.2 (46.8)	4.7 (40.5)	14.0 (57.2)
Daily mean °C (°F)	1.4 (34.5)	2.0 (35.6)	5.1 (41.2)	9.1 (48.4)	13.0 (55.4)	15.9 (60.6)	18.0 (64.4)	17.9 (64.2)	13.9 (57.0)	9.6 (49.3)	5.4 (41.7)	2.4 (36.3)	9.5 (49.1)
Mean daily minimum °C (°F)	−1.4 (29.5)	−1.2 (29.8)	0.9 (33.6)	3.1 (37.6)	6.8 (44.2)	9.8 (49.6)	11.9 (53.4)	11.8 (53.2)	8.7 (47.7)	5.7 (42.3)	2.6 (36.7)	−0.2 (31.6)	4.9 (40.8)
Average precipitation mm (inches)	48.3 (1.90)	37.5 (1.48)	42.9 (1.69)	35.3 (1.39)	63.3 (2.49)	65.3 (2.57)	72.2 (2.84)	63.4 (2.50)	48.4 (1.91)	48.3 (1.90)	49.2 (1.94)	47.3 (1.86)	624 (24.6)
Average precipitation days (≥ 1.0 mm)	17.0	15.4	15.2	12.6	14.2	14.2	15.2	13.9	13.2	15.4	16.4	18.4	181.2
Average snowy days (≥ 1.0 cm)	7.6	7.2	2.8	0	0	0	0	0	0	0	1.4	4.4	23.4
Average relative humidity (%)	83.8	80.7	76.9	71.7	73.5	75.1	73.8	72.4	78.5	83.3	85.9	85.5	78.4
Mean monthly sunshine hours	49.2	70.7	117.1	173.5	200.9	205.9	207.3	196.1	144.0	98.7	47.6	37.6	1,556.1
Source: World Meteorological Organization

== Demographics ==
Historical population
Year	Pop.	±%
1393	6,000	—
1503	5,000	−16.7%
1600	4,000	−20.0%
1700	3,100	−22.5%
1812	8,957	+188.9%
1833	9,968	+11.3%
1871	15,847	+59.0%
1900	30,234	+90.8%
1919	41,246	+36.4%
1933	47,149	+14.3%
1939	51,214	+8.6%
1950	78,680	+53.6%
1961	80,377	+2.2%
1970	108,991	+35.6%
1987	114,698	+5.2%
2011	116,052	+1.2%
2018	119,801	+3.2%
Population size may be affected by changes in administrative divisions. source:

The city's population has increased since the Middle Ages. With the arrival of the early modern period, the growth rate greatly accelerated. The population peaked at 132,100 in 1985. In 2004, it stood at 129,466, of which around 24,000 were students.

== Transport ==
The Göttingen bus system is run by the GöVB (Göttinger Verkehrsbetriebe). Buses run throughout the city and to the neighbouring villages, as well as intercity bus services from the station Göttingen ZOB, adjacent to the railway station.

Göttingen railway station lies west of the medieval town centre and provides links to several destinations in Germany.

The nearest international airport is Hannover Airport, located 136 km (85 mi) north of Göttingen.

Like most German cities, the town is bicycle-friendly, with bicycle paths throughout the commercial areas (except for in pedestrian-only shopping areas) and beyond. The time to pedal to the city centre from the outskirts is fifteen to twenty minutes.

== Religion ==
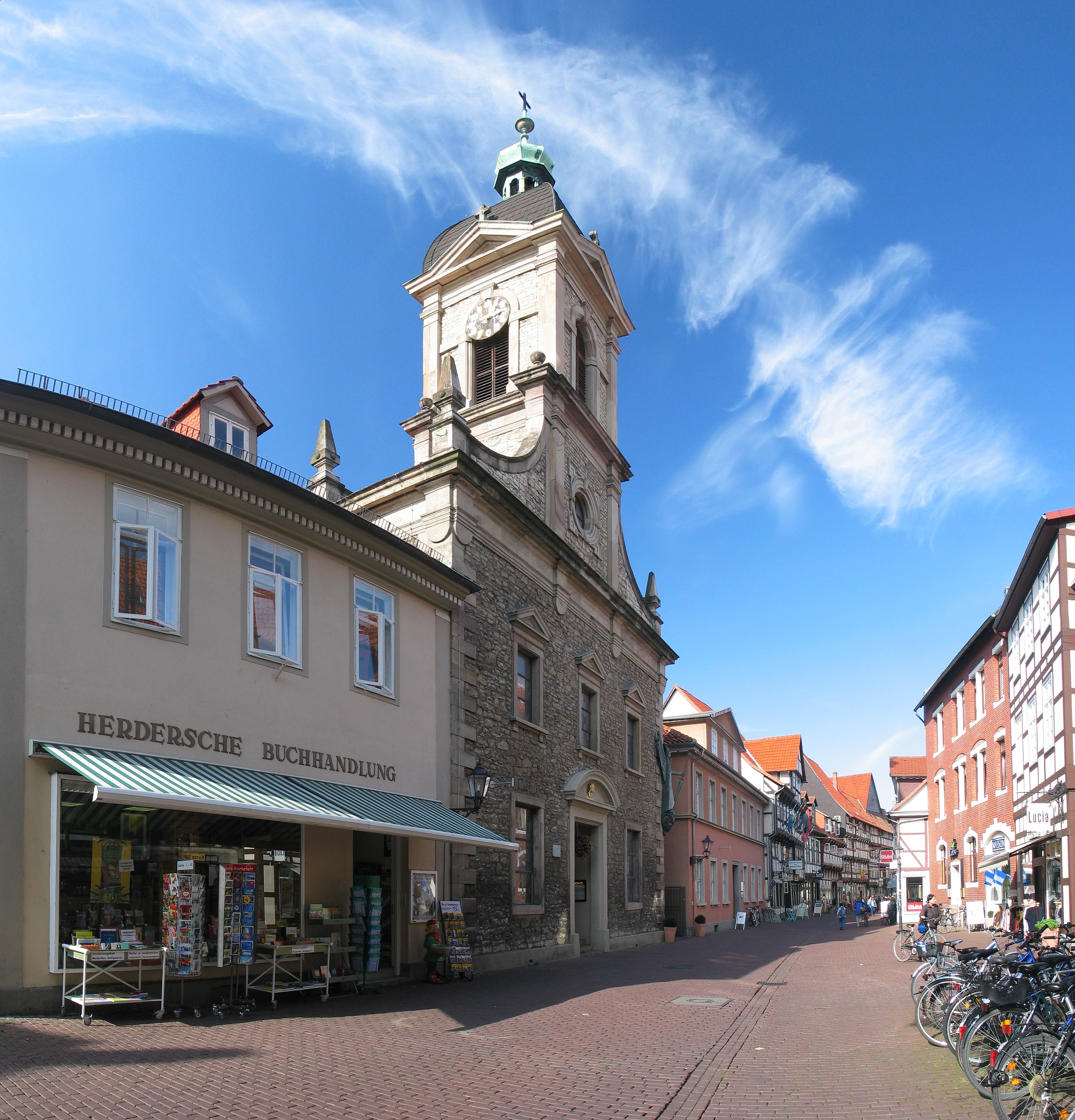
St. Michael Church

After the Middle Ages, the area of Göttingen was part of the archbishopric of Mainz, and most of the population were Roman Catholic. Starting in 1528, the teachings of church reformer Martin Luther became more and more popular in the city. In 1529 the first Protestant sermon was preached in the Paulinerkirche, a former Dominican monastery church. For many centuries, nearly all of the population of the city were Lutherans. As of today, the area of Göttingen is part of the Lutheran Church of Hanover. Apart from this state church, there are several other Protestant churches in Göttingen, known as Freikirchen. In 1746, Catholic services in Göttingen were resumed, at first only for the students of the new university, but a year later for all citizens who wished to attend. However, it was not until 1787 that the first Catholic church since the Reformation, St. Michael's, was built. In 1929 a second Catholic church, St. Paul's, was erected. Today, the major religions are Lutheran and Catholicism. In addition, there has been a Baptist congregation since 1894, a Mennonite congregation since 1946, as well as a congregation of the Church of Jesus Christ of Latter-day Saints.

There is a documented Jewish community dating back to the 16th century. During the Third Reich, the synagogue was destroyed in the Reichspogromnacht on 9 November 1938, as were many others throughout Germany. The Jewish community was persecuted, and many of its members were murdered in Nazi concentration camps. In recent years, the Jewish community has again been flourishing, with the immigration of Jewish people from the states of the former Soviet Union. In 2004, the first Shabbat could be celebrated in the new Jewish community centre. Finally, there are many Islamic congregations. Islam gained a foothold in Göttingen, as it did in other German cities, with the immigration of the Turkish Gastarbeiter during the Wirtschaftswunder in the 1960s and 1970s. They constitute the majority of Muslims in Göttingen. Other Muslims are of Arab origin or come from West Asia. There are two mosques in the city.

There is a secular trend in Germany, especially in Eastern Germany, but also in the West, where a growing number of people are not baptised or leave the church. This trend is especially noticeable since the 1990s, percentagewise between 1990 and 2014 the Protestants in Göttingen dropped from 56.2 to 40.6% and the Catholics dropped from 17.1 to 15.6%.

== Politics ==
=== 2021 City Elections ===
Election 2021
Party	Seats	+/-	In Majority?
Greens	14	+5▲	opposition
SPD	11	-4 ▼	government
CDU	11	0	government
The Left	4	+1▲	opposition
FDP	3	0	government
BfnS	1	new	opposition
Volt	1	new	opposition
PARTEI	1	0	opposition
Total	46		

Prior to the 2021 election for the Göttingen city council, the centre-left Social Democratic Party (SPD) had a plurality of seats and governed along with the Greens, who are also broadly centre-left. After the election, the Green Party was left out of the governing coalition even though they won the most seats of any party, with 14.

The SPD and the centre-right Christian Democratic Union (CDU) had tied for second, with 11 seats each. The 22 seats this gave them, together with 3 more from the centre-right Free Democratic Party (FDP) gave the three parties enough votes to form a governing coalition of 25 of 46 seats. In 2021, the SPD candidate for Lord Mayor, Petra Broistedt won the race. The Lord Mayor is also part of the city council, meaning that the governing coalition formed after the 2021 election had 26 out of 47 seats in the council, the same number that an SPD-Green alliance could have had. The Greens were dissatisfied with the goals set forth in the more centrist SPD-CDU-FDP government's plan, citing insufficient investment in climate protection, specifically in terms of windmills in the city.

The Alliance for Sustainable Urban Development (German: Bündnis für nachhaltige Stadtentwicklung; abbreviation BfnS), which was formed in September 2019, won a single seat in the elections. The other minor parties which won a seat were Volt Germany, which is essentially Germany's chapter of the wider European Volt party, and the PARTEI. Additionally, The Left won 4 seats.

=== Background and Historic Info ===
A town council with 24 councillors dates from the 12th century. In 1319 this council took control of the new city district (Neustadt) just in front of the wall. The council election took place on the Mondays following Michaelmas (29 September). Starting in 1611 all citizens were able to elect the 24 councillors. Previously this right was restricted and depended on income and profession. Afterwards, the council elected the Bürgermeister (mayor). In 1669 the number of councillors was reduced to 16, and later to 12. In 1690 the city administration was reorganised again. Then the council consisted of the judge, two mayors, the city lawyer (Syndikus), the secretary and eight councillors. All of these were appointed by the government. During the Napoleonic era the mayor was called Maire, and there was also a city council. In 1831 there was another reform of the constitution and the administration. The title of the mayor changed to Oberbürgermeister. In the following decades there were more reforms to the city administration, which reflected the constitutional and territorial reorganisations of Germany. During the Third Reich the mayor was appointed by the Nazi Party.

In 1946 the authorities of the British Occupation Zone, to which Göttingen then belonged, introduced a communal constitution which reflected the British model.

== Coat of arms ==
The coat of arms of Göttingen shows in the top half three silver towers with red roofs on a field of blue. The lateral towers possess four windows each and are crowned by golden crosses. Around the central tower are four silver balls. The city towers represent the status as a city which has been granted certain rights. In the bottom field is a golden lion on a red field. This lion represents the lion of the Welf dynasty, which in its various branches ruled the area of Göttingen for 850 years. This coat of arms was first documented in 1278. The city has sometimes used a simpler one, consisting of a black capital "G" on a golden field, topped with a crown.

== International relations ==
The city is the namesake of Göttingen Street, Halifax, Nova Scotia, Canada.

=== Twin towns – sister cities ===
Coats of arms of twin towns of Cheltenham, Göttingen and Toruń

Göttingen is twinned with:

- Cheltenham, England, United Kingdom (1951)
- Toruń, Poland (1978)
- Pau, France (1983)
- Wittenberg, Germany (1988)

=== Cooperation and solidarity ===
Göttingen cooperates with:

- Hiroshima, Japan (1987)
- La Paz Centro, Nicaragua (1989)
- Qixia (Nanjing), China (2010)

== Notable people ==
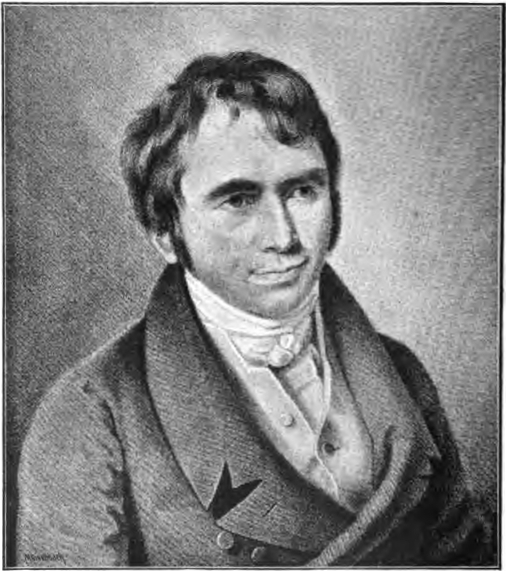
August Neander

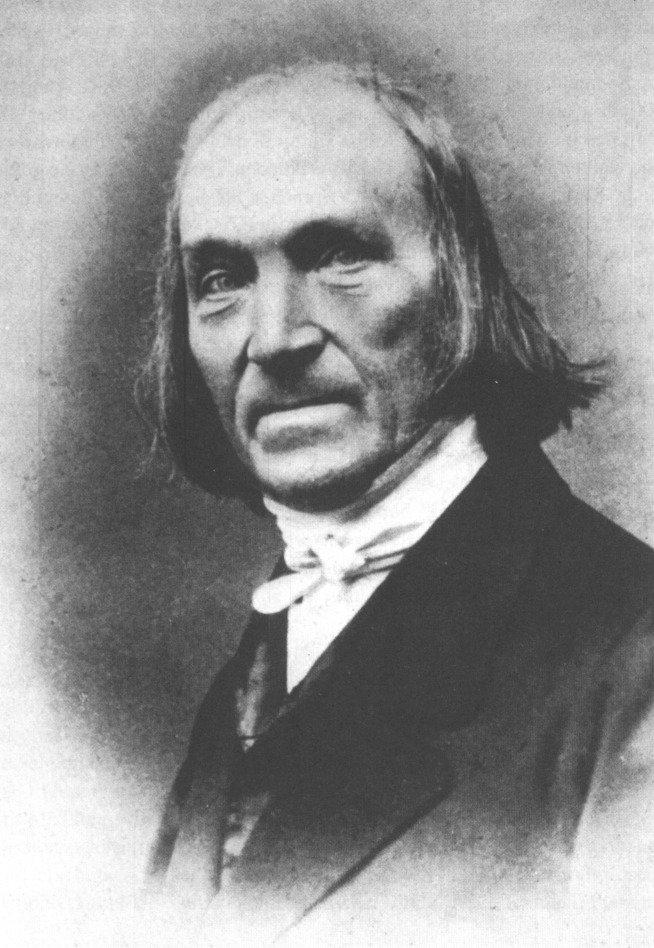
Heinrich Ewald, before 1875

=== Public service ===
- Caroline Schelling (1763–1809), noted German intellectual
- August Heinrich Matthiae (1769–1835), classical scholar
- August Neander (1789–1850), theologian and church historian
- Friedrich August Grotefend (1798–1836), philologist
- Heinrich Ewald (1803–1875), theologian and orientalist.
- August Wilhelm Dieckhoff (1823–1894), Lutheran theologian
- Wilhelm Heinrich Roscher (1845–1923), classical philologist
- Rudolf Wissell (1869–1962), politician and Minister during the Weimar Republic
- Emma Sachse (1887–1965), political activist and state chairwoman of the AWO in Thuringia
- Alfred Meyer (1891–1945), Nazi Party official and politician
- Helmuth Plessner (1892–1985), philosopher and sociologist, advocated philosophical anthropology
- Vladimir Lossky (1903–1958), a Russian Eastern Orthodox theologian exiled in Paris
- Woldemar Voigt (1907–1980), engineer, designed advanced swept wing jet-powered aircraft
- Kurt Vieweg (1911–1976), a leading agricultural politician in the early years of the GDR
- Harald Gelhaus (1915–1997), a U-boat commander in World War II
- Hans-Jochen Vogel (1926–2020), politician, Mayor of Munich from 1960 to 1972
- Bernhard Vogel (born 1932), politician, Minister President of Rhineland-Palatinate & Thuringia
- Hartwig Hohnsbein (born 1937), political scientist, retired pastor, author
- Peter Struck (1943–2012), lawyer and politician, Minister of Defence, 2002 to 2005
- Conny Wessmann (1965–1989), antifascist activist, killed during a police raid
- Suzanne Jovin (1977–1998), unsolved US murder victim at Yale University

=== The arts ===
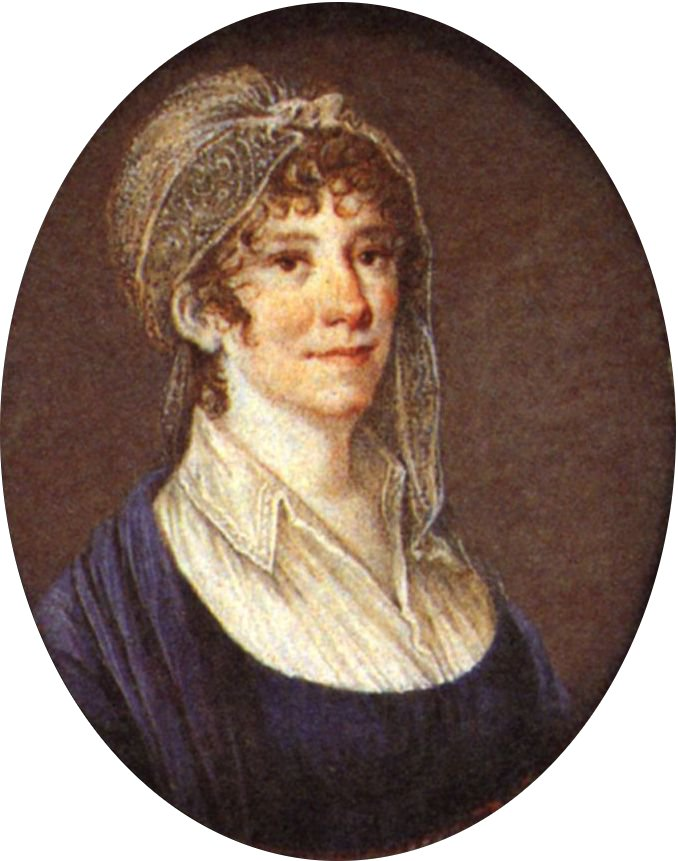
Therese Huber, 1804

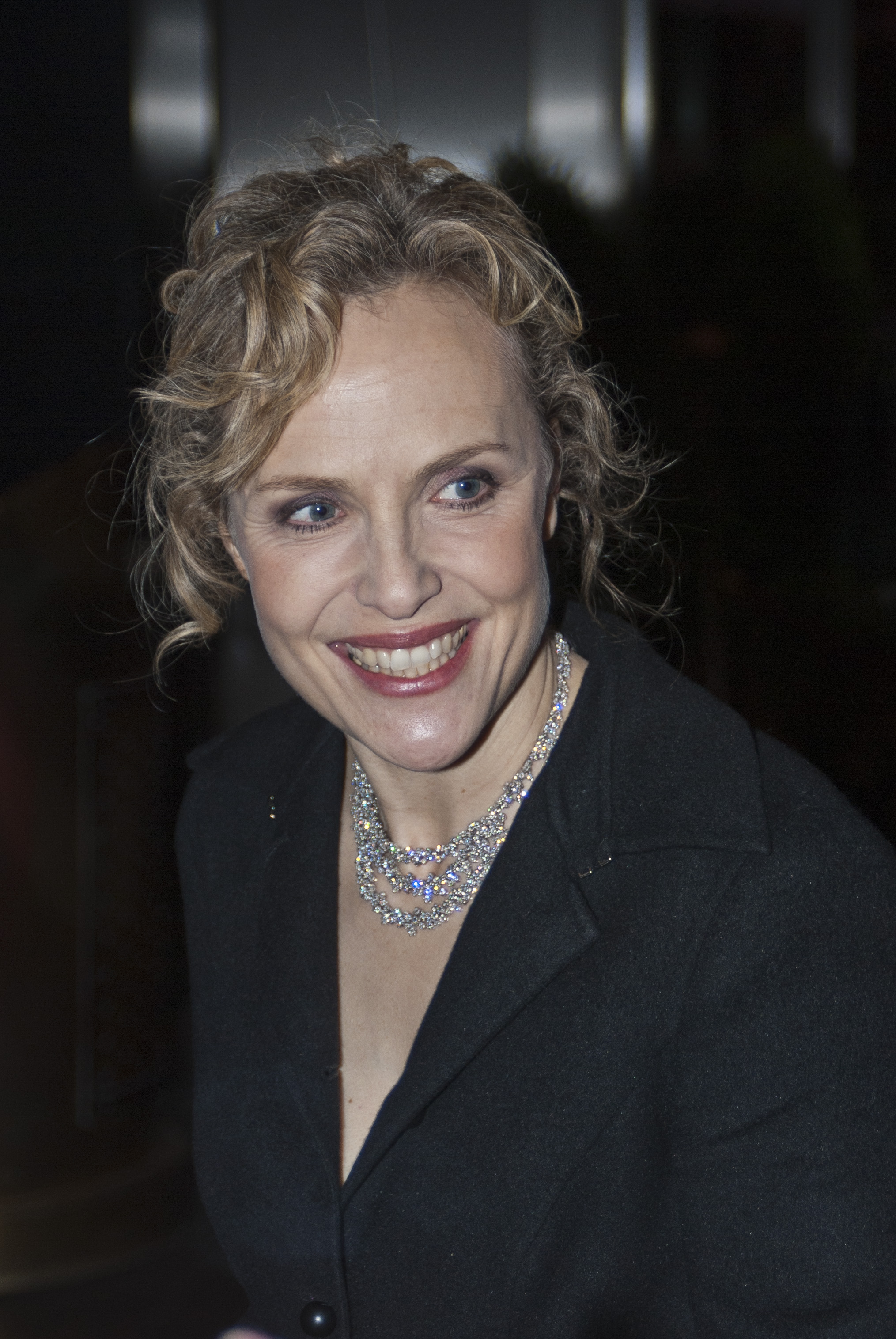
Juliane Köhler, 2009

- Friedrich Ludwig Heinrich Waagen (1750–1822), a portrait, history and landscape painter
- Therese Huber (1764–1829), author, one of a group of five academically active women
- Carl Oesterley (1805–1891), art historian and oil painter with Biblical themes
- Anna Teichmüller (1861–1940), composer who set the works of many poets to music
- Heinrich Schachtebeck (1886–1965), violinist, conductor and university lecturer
- Helmut Weiss (1907–1969), actor, screenwriter and film director
- Tresi Rudolph (1911–1997), operatic soprano and actress
- Uta Hagen (1919–2004), German-American actress and theatre practitioner
- Ingrid Brainard (1925–2000), musicologist, dance historian and teacher of historical dance
- Jürgen Ahrend (1930–2024), organ builder
- Gunter Hampel (1937–2026), jazz multi-instrumentalist and composer
- Kai Engelke (1946–2025), poet, writer, singer-songwriter, and teacher
- Bodo von Dewitz (1950–2017), an art historian, focused on historical photography
- Andreas Staier (born 1955), pianist and harpsichordist, Historically Informed Performance specialist
- Herbert Grönemeyer (born 1956), singer, musician, producer, composer and actor
- Chris Kraus (born 1963), author and film director
- Michael Schneider (born 1964), composer and musicologist
- Iris Eichenberg (born 1965), contemporary artist and metalsmith, works at Cranbrook Educational Community
- Juliane Köhler (born 1965), theatre, TV and film actress
- Roland Schimmelpfennig (born 1967), theatre director and playwright
- Sandra Nasić (born 1976), singer, vocalist of the rock band Guano Apes
- Christian Büttner (born 1979), stage name, TheFatRat, electronic dance music producer
- Luisa Heese (born 1984), director of the Museum im Kulturspeicher Würzburg
- Niklas Liepe (born 1990), classical violinist

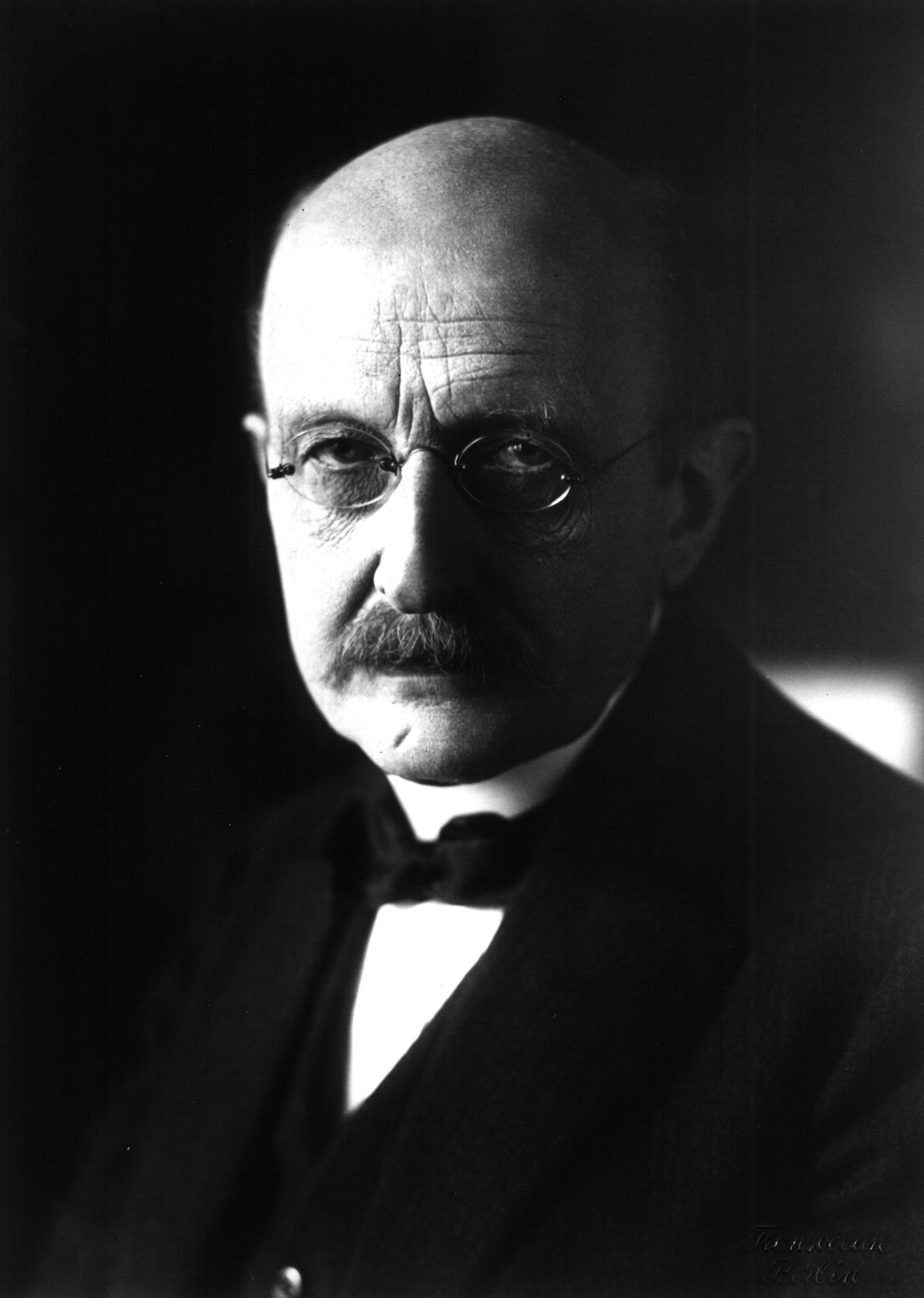
Max Planck, c. 1930

=== Nobel Prize winners ===
- Max Planck (1858–1947), physicist, won the Nobel Prize in Physics 1918
- Richard Adolf Zsigmondy (1865–1929), chemist, won the Nobel Prize in Chemistry in 1925
- Otto Hahn (1879–1968), chemist, won the Nobel Prize in Chemistry in 1944
- Max Born (1882–1970), physicist and mathematician, won the Nobel Prize in Physics in 1954
- Manfred Eigen (1927–2019), biophysical chemist, won the Nobel Prize in Chemistry in 1967
- Thomas C. Südhof (born 1955), biochemist, won the Nobel Prize in Physiology or Medicine in 2013

=== More science & business ===
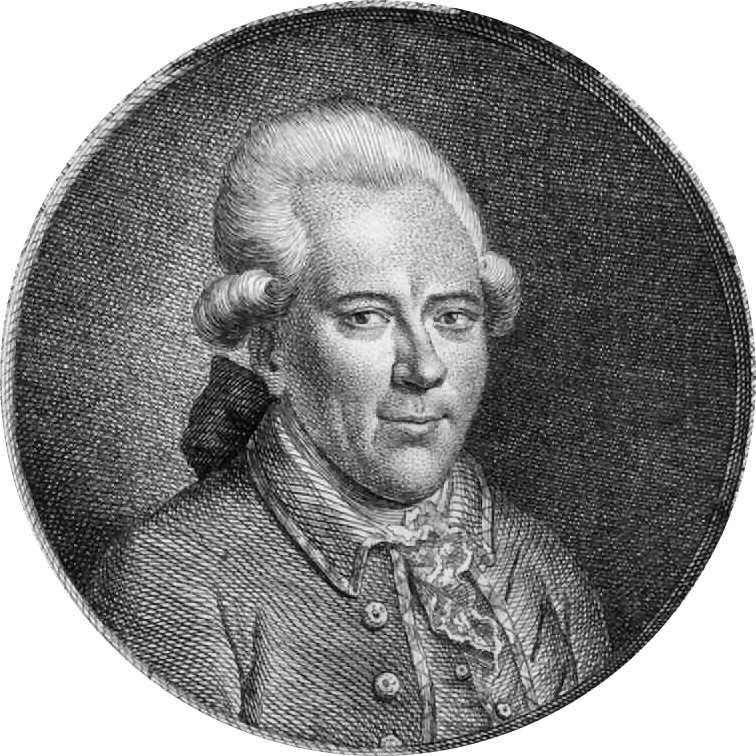
Georg Christoph Lichtenberg

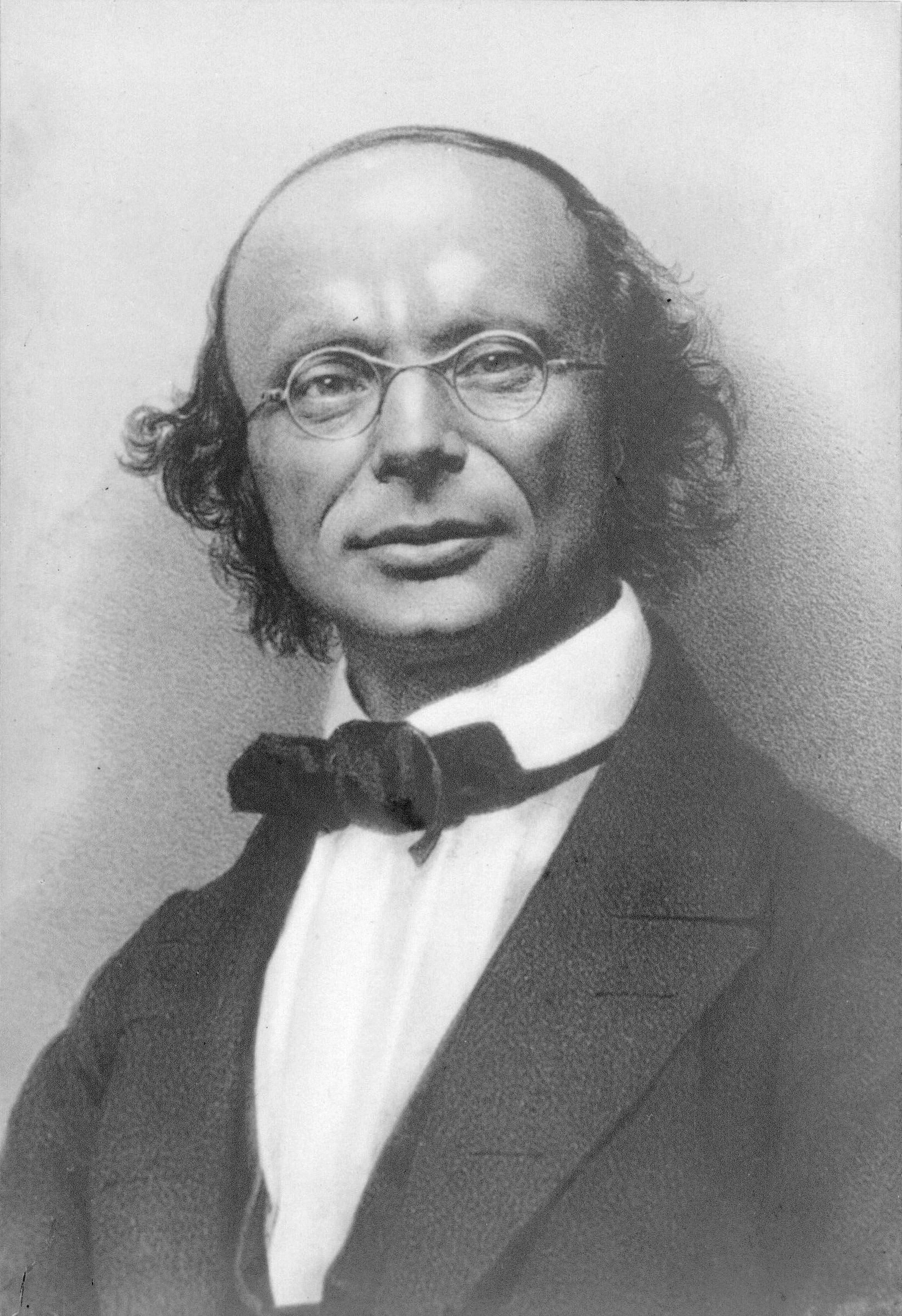
Wilhelm Eduard Weber

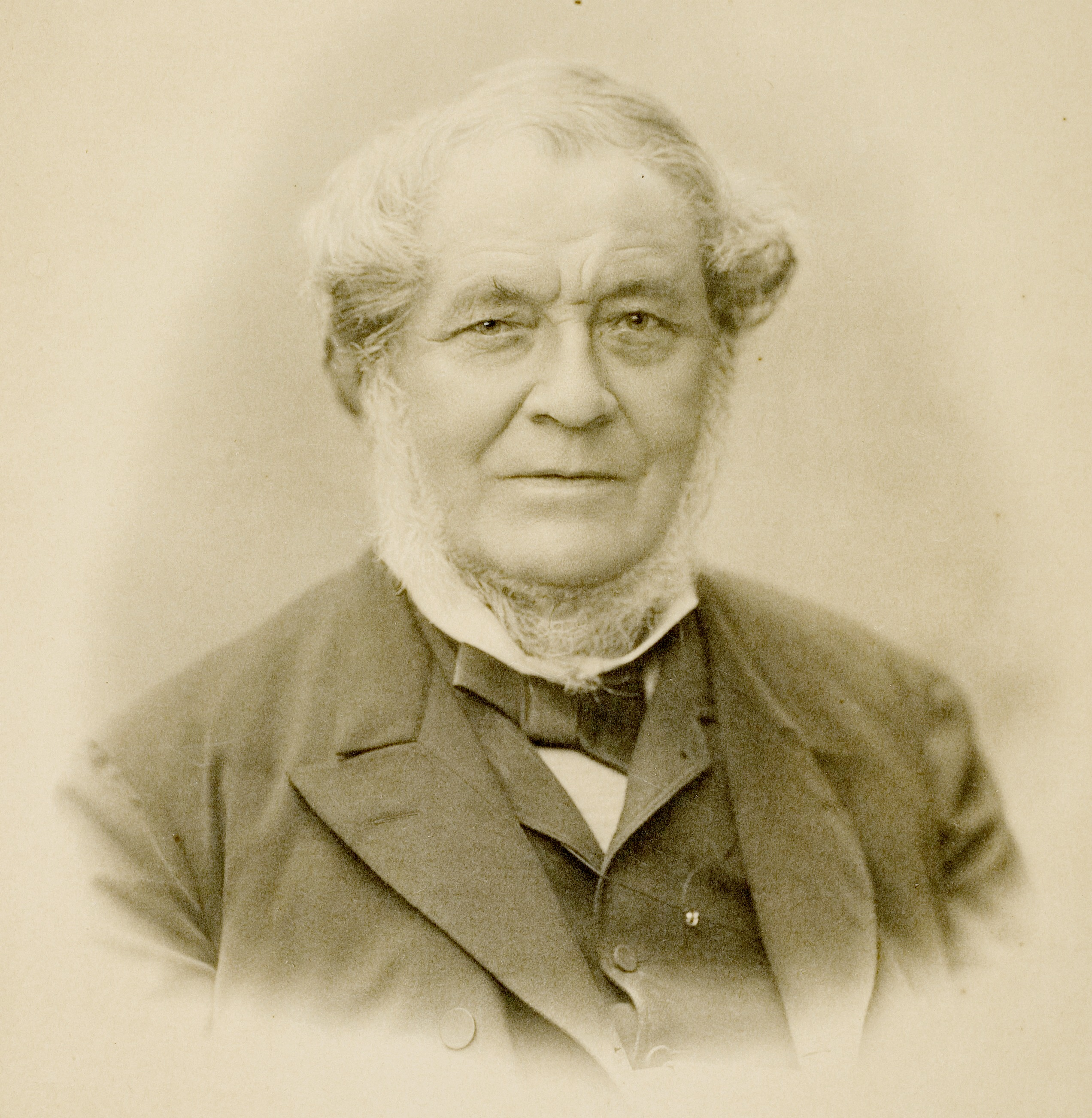
Robert Bunsen

- Georg Christoph Lichtenberg (1742–1799), physicist, satirist and Anglophile
- Friedrich Stromeyer FRSE (1776–1835), chemist, discovered cadmium
- Carl Friedrich Gauss (1777–1855), mathematician and physicist
- Leopold Gmelin (1788–1853), chemist, worked on red prussiate and created Gmelin's test
- Heinrich Christian Eisenbrandt (1790-1860), manufacturer of brass and woodwind instruments
- Friedrich August von Ammon (1799–1861), surgeon and ophthalmologist
- Friedrich Wöhler (1800–1882), chemist, worked on inorganic chemistry
- Wilhelm Eduard Weber (1804–1891), physicist
- Peter Gustav Lejeune Dirichlet (1805–1859), mathematician, contributed to number theory
- Rudolf Kohlrausch (1809–1858), physicist
- Wolfgang Sartorius von Waltershausen (1809–1876), geologist
- Robert Bunsen (1811–1899), chemist, investigated emission spectra of heated elements
- Carl Bergmann (1814–1865), anatomist, physiologist and biologist, developed Bergmann's rule
- Hermann Kolbe (1818–1884), contributed to the birth of modern organic chemistry
- Arthur Auwers (1838–1915), astronomer
- Felix Klein (1849–1925), mathematician, worked on group theory
- Lou Andreas-Salomé (1861–1937), psychoanalyst, well-travelled author, narrator and essayist
- David Hilbert (1862–1943), mathematics polymath.
- Hermann Minkowski (1864–1909), mathematician, developed the geometry of numbers
- Ludwig Prandtl (1875–1953), fluid dynamicist, physicist and aerospace scientist
- Harald Schering (1880–1959), physicist, worked on electricity, invented the Schering Bridge
- Johannes Heinrich Schultz (1884–1970), psychiatrist, developed autogenic training
- Theodor Kaluza (1885–1954), mathematician and physicist, worked on the Kaluza–Klein theory
- Kurt Reidemeister (1893–1971), mathematician, worked on differential geometry
- Carl Ludwig Siegel (1896–1981), mathematician, worked on analytic number theory
- Max Deuring (1907–1984), mathematician, worked on arithmetic geometry
- Dietrich Küchemann CBE FRS (1911–1976), aerodynamicist, worked in the UK on Concorde
- Gerry Neugebauer (1932–2014), astronomer, worked on infrared astronomy
- Jens Reich (born 1939), physician and biochemist, founder of the New Forum in the German Democratic Republic
- Gerhard Steidl (born 1950), printer and publisher, founded the publisher Steidl
- Hendrik Streeck (born 1977), HIV researcher, epidemiologist and clinical trialist
- Anna Frebel (born 1980), astronomer working on the oldest stars in the universe

=== Philosophy ===
Jürgen Habermas (18 June 1929 – 14 March 2026)

=== Sport ===
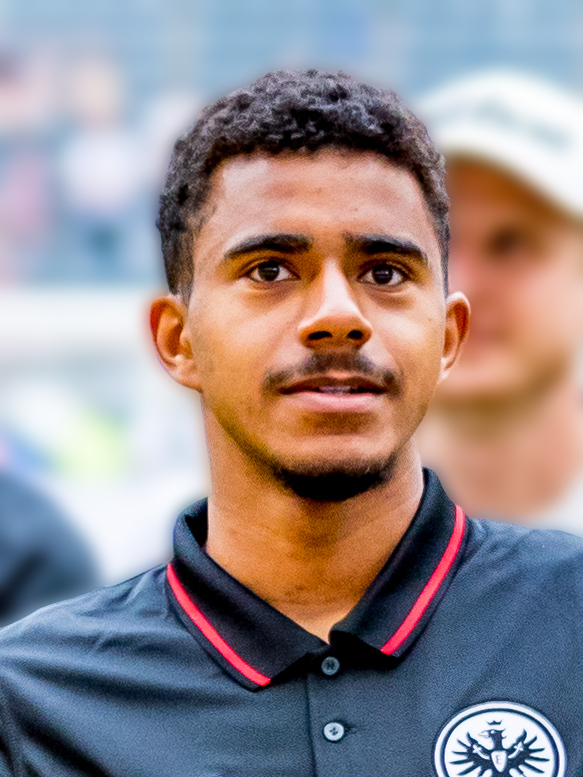
Ansgar Knauff, 2022

- Hans Duhm (1878–1946), Dietrich Duhm (1880–1954) & Andreas Duhm (1883–1975), a family of chess masters
- Christian Sackewitz (born 1955), a former footballer with 286 club caps
- Sophie von Saldern (born 1973), a former women's basketball player, played 106 times for Germany
- Franziska Gude (born 1976) a field hockey midfielder and team gold medallist at the 2004 Summer Olympics
- Timo Ochs (born 1981), retired footballer with 220 club caps
- Michael Schulze (born 1989), a former footballer with 248 club caps
- Maximilian Beister (born 1990), footballer with over 250 club caps
- Adriano Grimaldi (born 1991), footballer with over 280 club caps
- Ansgar Knauff (born 2002), footballer with over 60 club caps so far

== Sport ==
Göttingen has:

- some football (soccer) teams, playing in amateur leagues e.g. 1. SC Göttingen 05 in the Landesliga Braunschweig
- a cricket club
- a bowling alley
- an American football team
- a baseball team
- at least two skittles alleys.
- an indoor swimming complex and a number of outdoor pools.
- a sports stadium (Jahn-Stadion)
- Men's basketball teams, including ASC 1846 Göttingen (national champions in 1979–80, 1982–83, 1983–84) and BG Göttingen (playing since 2007 in the first league in Germany and EuroChallenge winners of 2009–10)
- Women's basketball teams including Medical Instinct Veilchen BG 74 which plays in the first league Bundesliga; a second women's team from Göttingen plays in Germany's second regional league

== Universities and colleges ==
Göttingen is officially a 'university town' and is known particularly for its university.

- Georg-August University of Göttingen, https://www.uni-goettingen.de/
- Göttingen Academy of Sciences and Humanities, https://adw-goe.de/en/home/
- German Aerospace Centre, http://www.dlr.de/en/desktopdefault.aspx/tabid-343/470_read-664/
- Private University of Applied Sciences, https://www.pfh.de/
- University of Applied Sciences and Arts, http://www.fh-goettingen.de
- Goethe-Institut Göttingen, https://www.goethe.de/goettingen/
- Max Planck Institute for Biophysical Chemistry
- Max Planck Institute for Experimental Medicine
- Max Planck Institute for the Study of Religious and Ethnic Diversity
- Max Planck Institute for Dynamics and Self-Organization
- Max Planck Institute for Solar System Research
- German Primate Center, https://www.dpz.eu

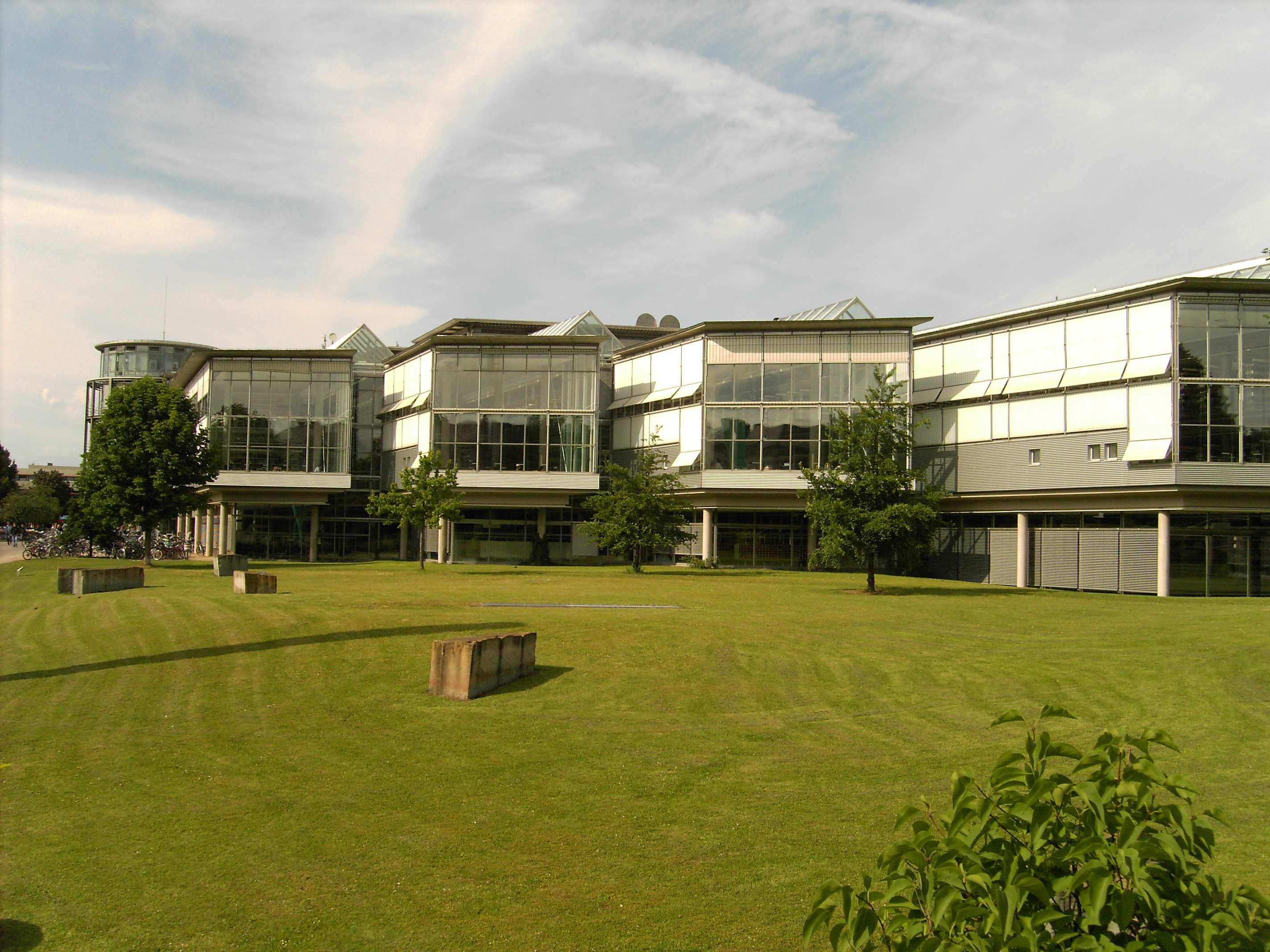
Göttingen State and University Library (SUB)

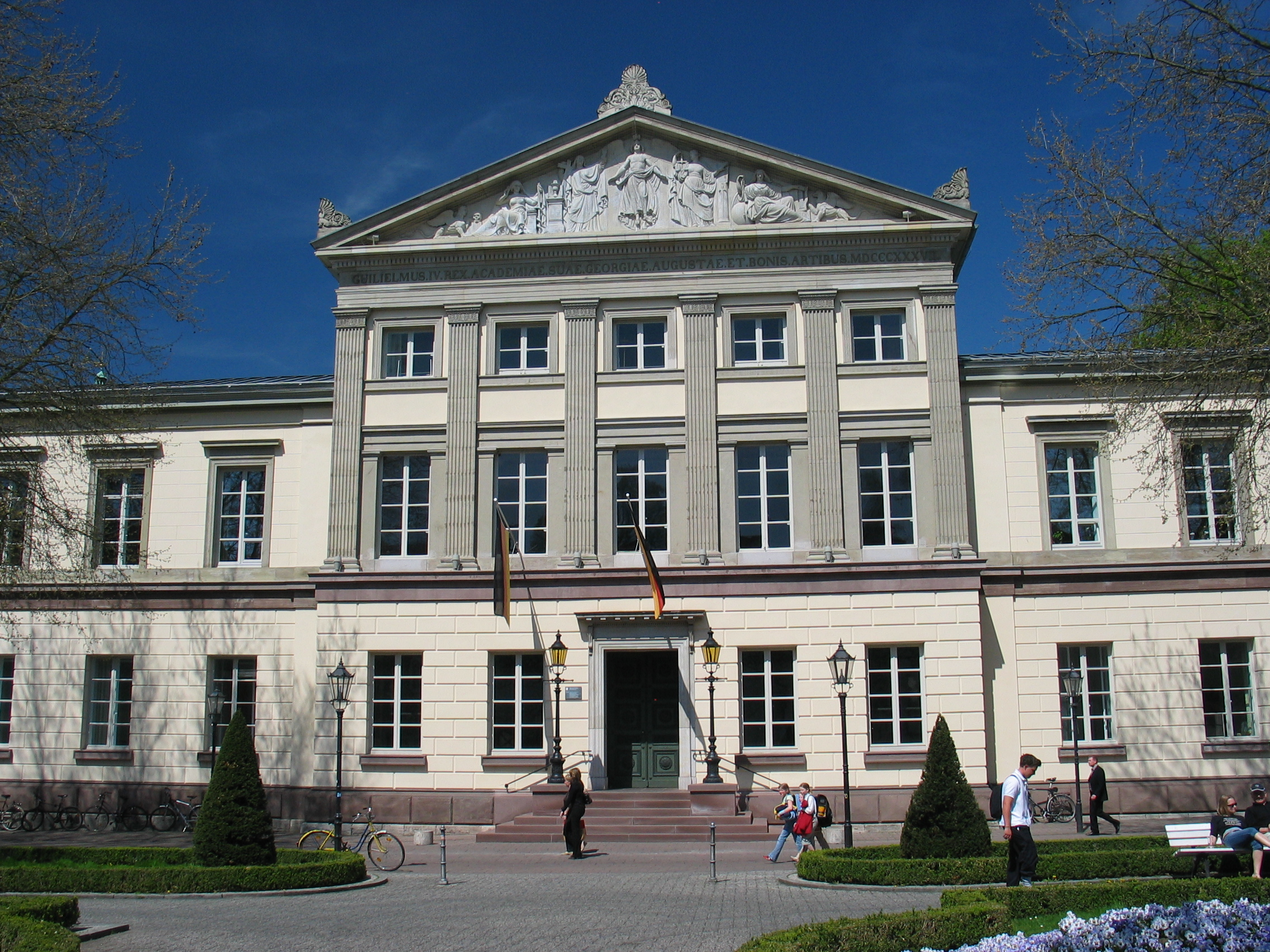
Assembly Hall on the Wilhelmsplatz

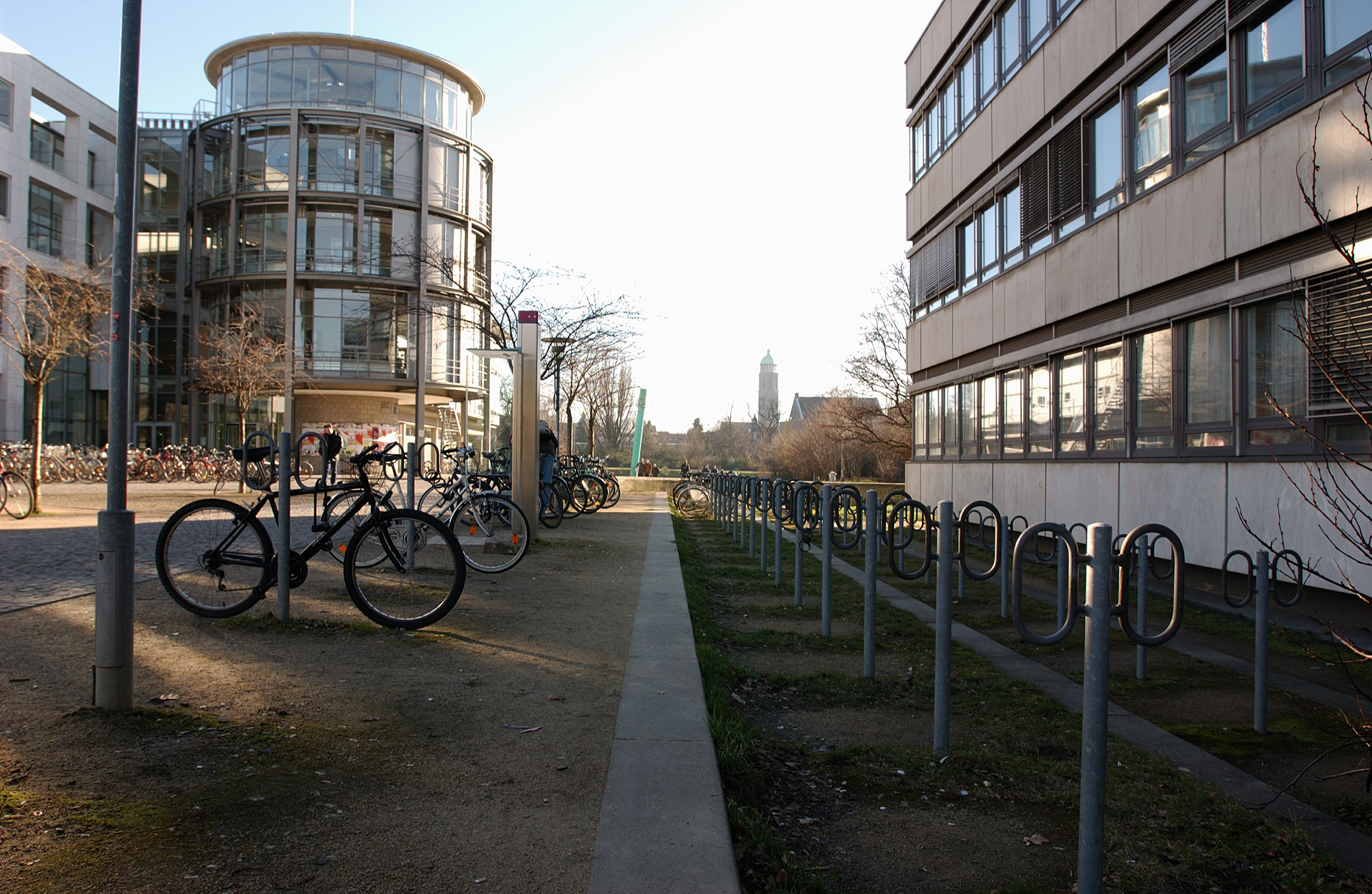
View from University Campus looking South

== Cultural establishments ==
=== Theatre ===
Göttingen has two professional theatres, the Deutsches Theater and the Junges Theater. In addition, there is Theater im OP, which mostly presents student productions.

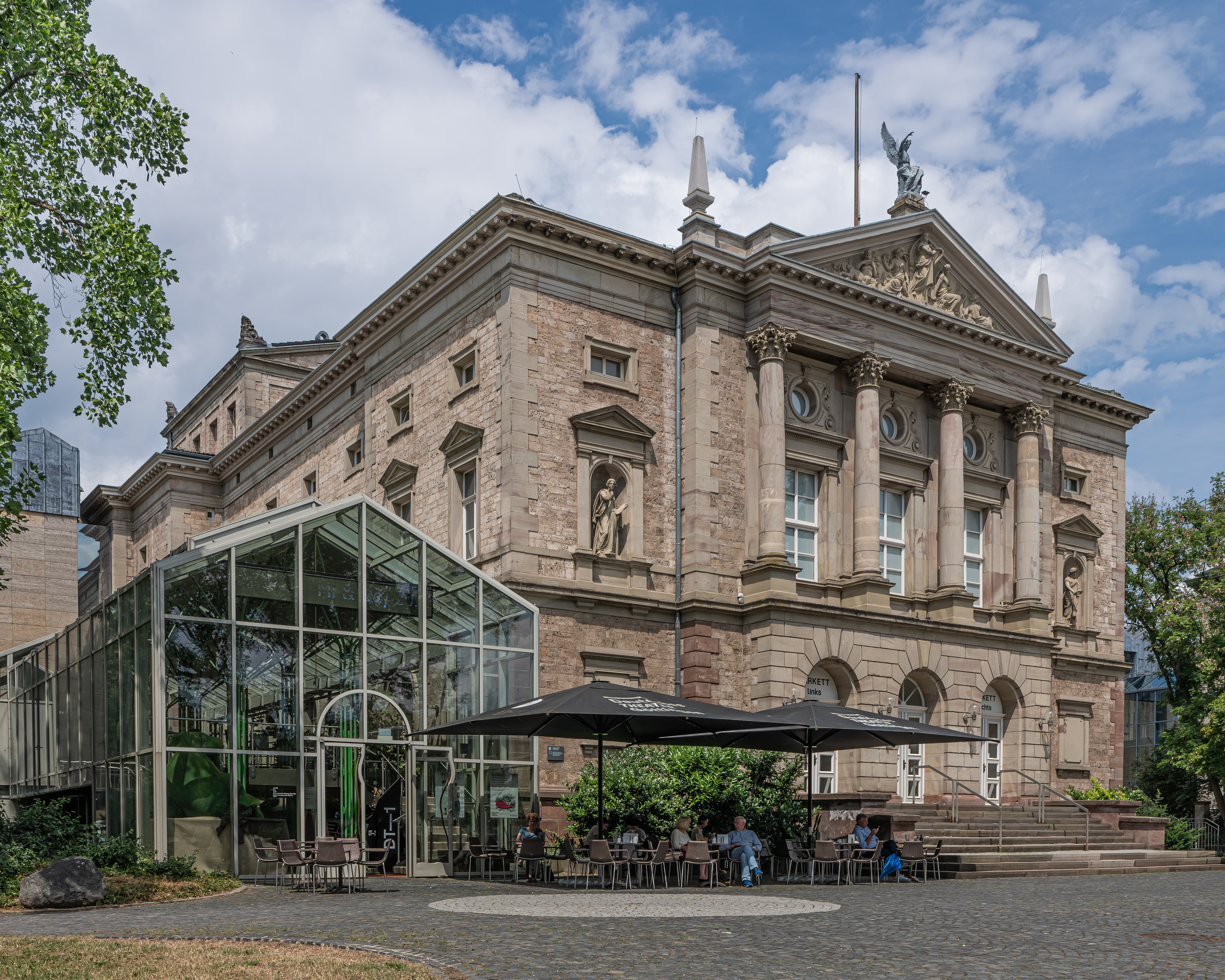
Deutsches Theater

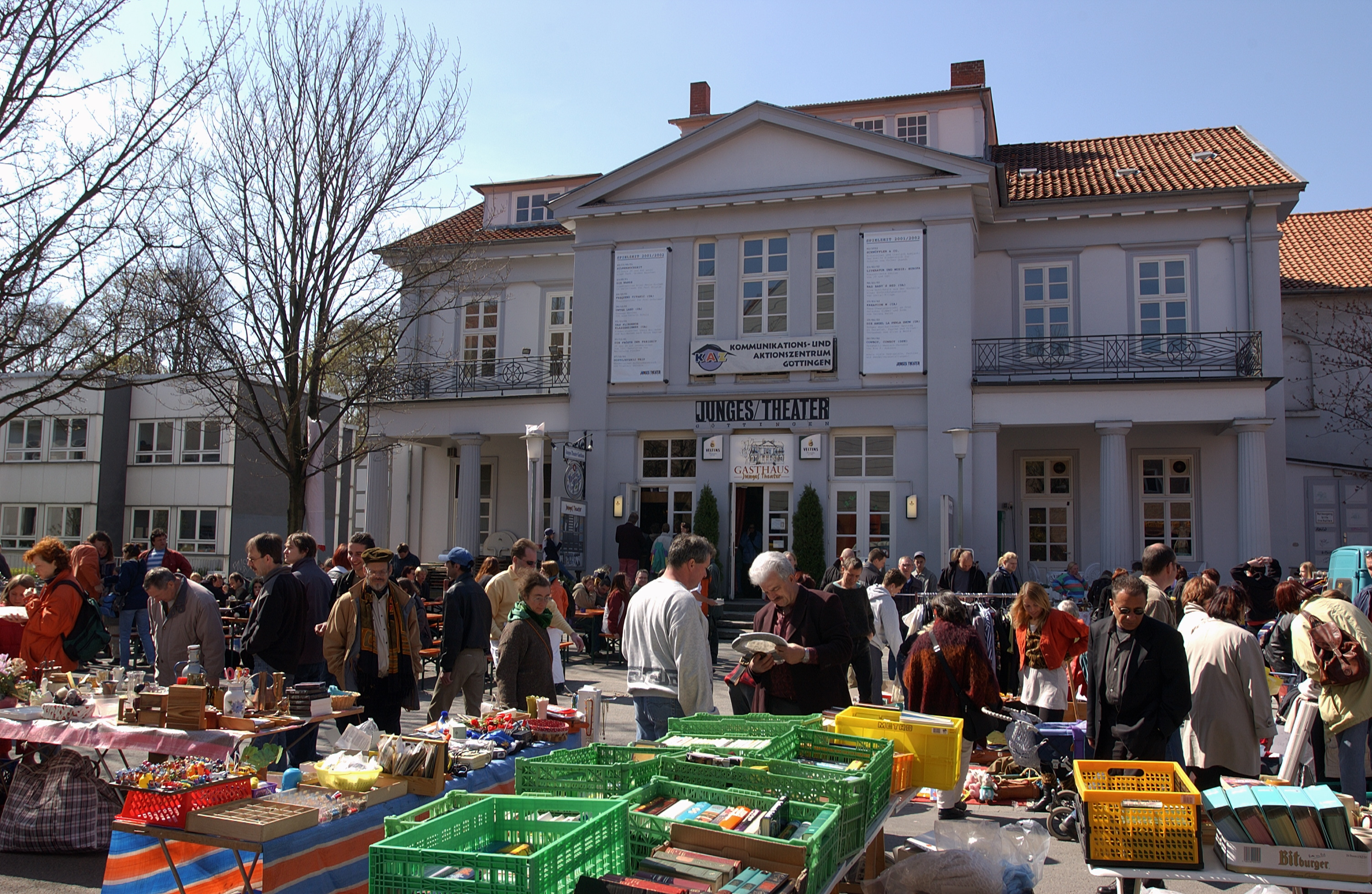
Junges Theater, Wochenmarkt shows Tobias browsing front left brown jacket

=== Museums, collections, exhibitions ===
- Göttingen City Museum (Städtisches Museum Göttingen) has permanent and temporary exhibitions of historical and artistic materials, although most of the building is currently closed for renovation.
- The university's Ethnographic Collection includes an internationally significant South Seas exhibition (Cook/Forster collection) and mostly 19th-century materials from the Arctic polar region (Baron von Asch collection) as well as major displays on Africa.
- The Old City Hall (Altes Rathaus) has temporary art shows of local, regional, and international artists.
- The Paulinerkirche in the Historical University Library building has various temporary exhibitions, usually of a historic nature.

The university has a number of significant museums and collections.

=== Gardens ===
- Göttingen is home to four intercultural gardens and the German Association of International Gardens (Internationale Gärten e.V.).
- The university maintains three major botanical gardens:
  - Alter Botanischer Garten der Universität Göttingen
  - Neuer Botanischer Garten der Universität Göttingen
  - Forstbotanischer Garten und Pflanzengeographisches Arboretum der Universität Göttingen, an arboretum and botanical garden.
- The city cemetery, the Stadtfriedhof is planted with groves of trees.
- Cheltenhampark, a park next to the historic city wall of Göttingen. The park is named after one of Göttingen's twin cities and is located next to the Albanifriedhof.

=== Local media ===
The local radio station Stadtradio Göttingen which is funded indirectly by the state of Lower Saxony broadcasts on FM 107.1 MHz and covers all parts of the city and some surrounding towns and villages. Its hourly news bulletins are the population's main source of local news. Additionally, the radio stations NDR 1, Hitradio Antenne Niedersachsen and Radio ffn provide specific local newscasts on their affiliate local frequencies.

The regional newspaper Hessisch-Niedersächsische Allgemeine has editorial offices in Göttingen. Its local news service is available for free on the internet and competes directly with the "Stadtradio" news service:

- local news from Stadtradio Göttingen
- local news from HNA newspaper

The Göttinger Tageblatt, is published by the Hannoversche Allgemeine Zeitung on Mondays through Saturdays.

== See also ==
- Hannover–Braunschweig–Göttingen–Wolfsburg Metropolitan Region
