= Herberhausen =

Coordinates: 51.5396°N 9.9852°E

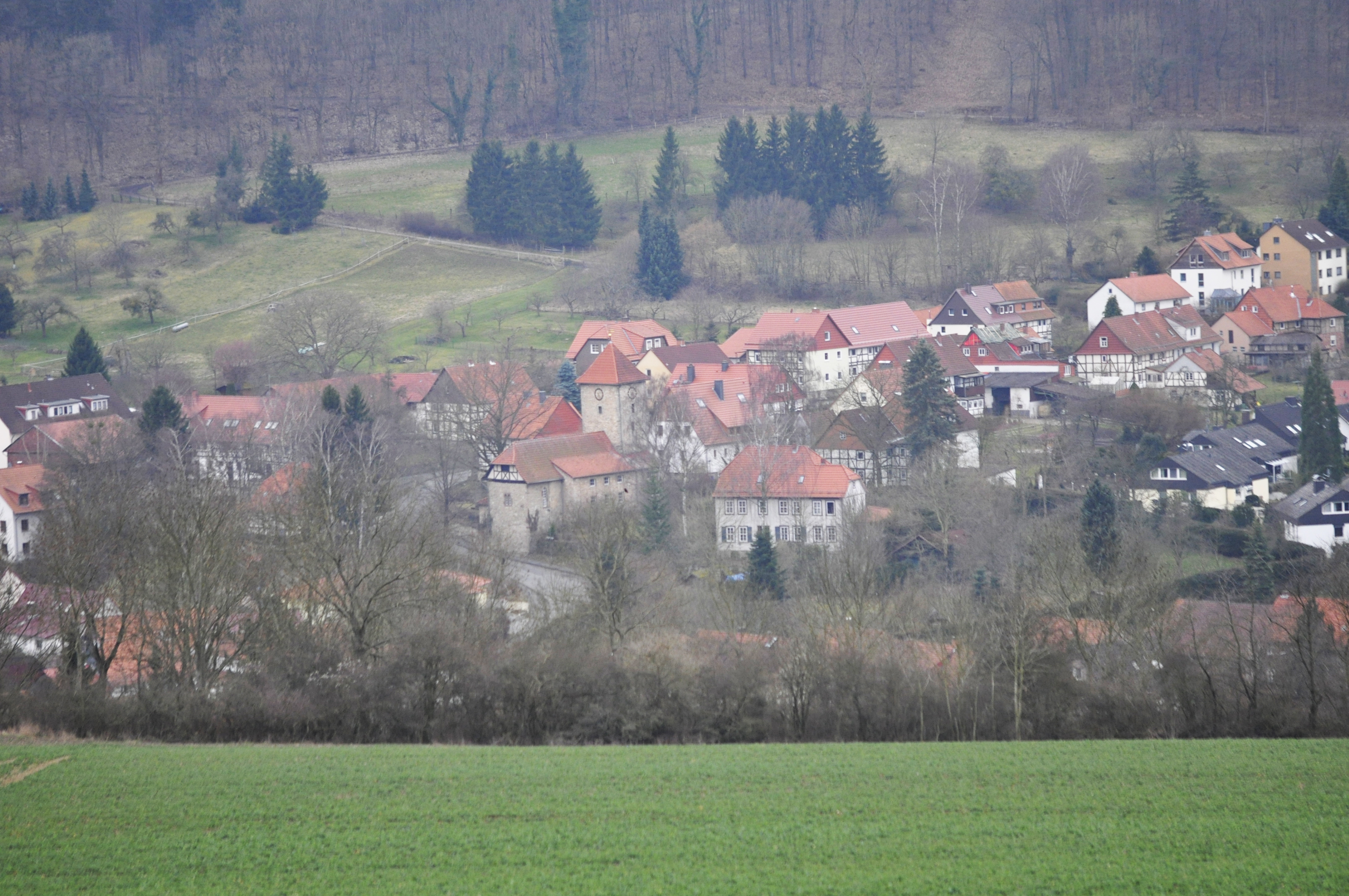
Herberhausen

Herberhausen (German pronunciation: [hɛʁbɐˈhaʊzn̩]) is a village (borough:Ortsteil) belonging to Göttingen, Lower Saxony, in Germany.

== Geography ==
The village lies 3.5 km (2.2 mi) to the east of downtown Göttingen, in the Luttertal (valley), under the shadow of the Göttingen Forest, which rises steeply upriver and on both sides of the upper village. The village centre's elevation is 240 metres above sea level.

The total area allotted to the borough (mostly forest) is 1524 ha.

== Etymology ==
In the fourteenth century, the community was called Herborgehusen and Herbergehusen. Toward the end of that century, the shortened form "Herberhusen" became the standard form.

== History ==
The earliest written document mentioning the town is from the year 1293. On 1 April 1963 the village was incorporated into the city of Göttingen as a borough.

== Population ==
(2006): 1,698
