= List of Lutheran churches =

This is a list of Lutheran churches that are notable either as congregations or as buildings.

== Canada ==
- First Lutheran Church (Vancouver)
- Redeemer Lutheran Church (Victoria, British Columbia)
- Trinity Evangelical Lutheran Church (Toronto)
- Emmanuel Lutheran Church (R M Lumsden, Saskatchewan)

== China ==
=== Former Lutheran churches in China ===
- Holy Cross Church, Chongqing
- Lutheran Church, Dalian
- German Lutheran Church, Harbin

== Denmark ==
- Aarhus Cathedral
- Frederik's Church, Copenhagen
- Church of the Holy Ghost, Copenhagen
- Church of Our Lady, Copenhagen
- Church of Our Saviour, Copenhagen
- Garrison Church, Copenhagen
- Grundtvig's Church, Copenhagen
- St. Paul's Church, Copenhagen
- St. Canute's Cathedral, Odense
- Maribo Cathedral
- Ribe Cathedral
- Roskilde Cathedral
- Viborg Cathedral

== Estonia ==
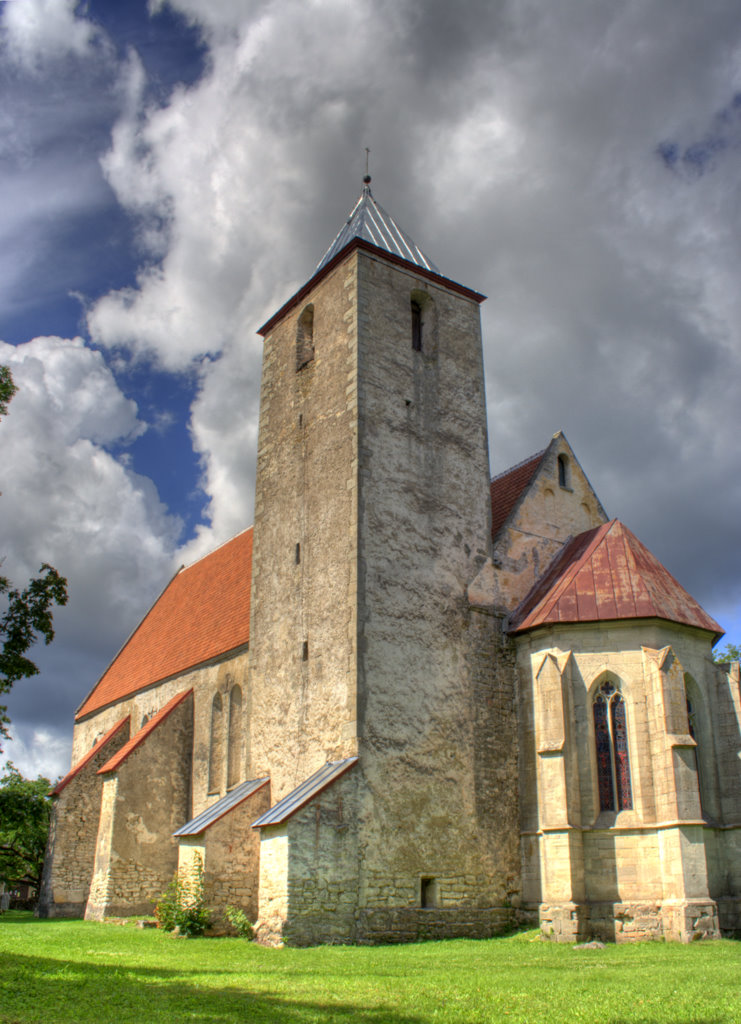
Valjala Church

- Charles's Church, Tallinn
- St. Mary's Cathedral, Tallinn
- Church of the Holy Spirit, Tallinn
- St. John's Church, Tartu
- St. Michael's Church, Tallinn
- St. Nicholas Church, Tallinn
- St. Olaf's Church, Tallinn
- St Peter's Church, Tartu
- Valjala Church, oldest church in Estonia

== Finland ==
- Helsinki Cathedral
- Espoo Cathedral
- Joensuu Church
- Kallio Church, Helsinki
- Kerimäki Church
- Kuopio Cathedral
- Lapua Cathedral
- Mikkeli Cathedral
- Oulu Cathedral
- Porvoo Cathedral
- Suomenlinna Church, Helsinki (originally an Eastern Orthodox church, converted to a Lutheran church in 1918)
- Tampere Cathedral
- Temppeliaukio Church, Helsinki
- Turku Cathedral

== France ==
- Saint Nicholas Church, Strasbourg
- Saint William's Church, Strasbourg
- St. Paul's Church (Strasbourg)
- Saint-Pierre-le-Jeune Protestant Church
- Temple Neuf

== Germany ==
- St. Anne's Church, Annaberg-Buchholz
- Bach Church, Arnstadt
- St. Anne's Church, Augsburg
- St. Lambert's Church, Bergen
- Capernaum Church, Berlin
- Gethsemane Church, Berlin
- St. Mary's Church, Berlin
- St. Nicholas' Church, Berlin
- St. Peter and St. Paul's Church, Detwang
- Anne's Church, Dresden
- Frauenkirche, Dresden
- Kreuzkirche, Dresden
- Sophienkirche, Dresden
- Zionskirche, Dresden
- St. Andrew's Church, Erfurt
- St Michael's Church, Erfurt
- Kaufmannskirche, Erfurt
- Reglerkirche, Erfurt
- St. Catherine's Church, Frankfurt
- St. Paul's Church, Frankfurt am Main
- Gandersheim Abbey
- St. Martin's Church, Groß Ellershausen
- Gustav Adolf Stave Church, Goslar
- St. Catherine's Church, Hamburg
- St. James' Church, Hamburg
- St. Mary's Church, Fuhlsbüttel, Hamburg
- St. Matthew's Church, Hamburg
- St. Nicholas' Church, Hamburg
- St. Peter's Church, Hamburg
- Neustädter Kirche, Hannover
- St. Kilian's Church, Heilbronn
- St. Andrew's Church, Hildesheim
- Zum Friedefürsten Church
- Limbach Municipal Church
- St. Catherine's Church, Lübeck
- St. Mary's Church, Lübeck
- St. John's Church, Lüneburg
- St. Mary's Church, Marienberg
- Mariental Abbey
- Merseburg Cathedral
- Divi Blasii, Mühlhausen
- St. Mary's Church, Mühlhausen
- St. Luke's Church, Munich
- St. Lorenz, Nuremberg
- St. Sebaldus Church, Nuremberg
- St. Mary's Church, Reutlingen
- St. Mary's Church, Rostock
- St. Peter's Church, Rostock
- St. James's Church, Rothenburg ob der Tauber
- Schelf Church
- St. Wolfgang's Church, Schneeberg
- Church of Saints Cosmas and Damian, Stade
- St. Mary's Church, Stralsund
- Church of St. Fabian and St. Sebastian, Sülze
- St. Bartholomew's Church, Themar
- St. George's Collegiate Church, Tübingen
- Ulm Minster
- Warnemünde Church
- All Saints' Church, Wittenberg
- Stadtkirche Wittenberg
- Zion's Church, Worpswede

== Iceland ==
- Akureyrarkirkja
- Hallgrímskirkja, Reykjavik

== Indonesia ==
- Angkola Protestant Christian Church
- Batak Christian Protestant Church
- Pakpak Dairi Christian Protestant Church
- Protestant Christian Church of Nias
- Simalungun Protestant Christian Church

== Israel ==
- Church of the Redeemer, Jerusalem

== Latvia ==
- Riga Cathedral
- Holy Trinity Cathedral, Liepāja
- Martin Luther Cathedral, Daugavpils
- St. Anna Evangelical Lutheran Church, Kuldīga

== Malaysia ==
- Basel Christian Church of Malaysia
- Evangelical Lutheran Church in Malaysia
- Lutheran Church in Malaysia
- Protestant Church in Sabah

== Norway ==
- Arctic Cathedral, Tromsø
- Heddal Stave Church
- Nidaros Cathedral, Trondheim
- Tromsø Cathedral

== Poland ==
- Vang Stave Church, built around 1200, moved from Norway in 1842
- Holy Trinity Church, Warsaw
- St. Matthew's Church, Łódź
- Jesus Church, Cieszyn
- Lutheran Church in Lublin
- Church of Peace in Świdnica
- Church of Peace in Jawor
- Church of St. Peter and St. Paul, Pabianice

== Russia ==
- The Lutheran Church of the Holy Catherine, Omsk
- Church of Saint Peter and Saint Paul, Yaroslavl
- Königsberg Cathedral, Kaliningrad
- Lutheran Church of Saint Michael, Saint Petersburg

== South Georgia ==
Church	Image	When built	Co-ordinates	Location	Notes
Norwegian Lutheran Church		1913	54°16′48″S 36°30′37″W	Grytviken	In what is now a British territory; Ernest Shackleton is buried there.

== Sweden ==
- Gothenburg Cathedral
- Carl Johan Church, Gothenburg
- Haga Church, Gothenburg
- Masthugg Church, Gothenburg
- Oscar Fredrik Church, Gothenburg
- Vasa Church, Gothenburg
- Kalmar Cathedral
- Karesuando Church
- Karlstad Cathedral
- Kiruna Church
- Linköping Cathedral
- Luleå Cathedral
- Lund Cathedral
- Adolf Fredrik Church, Stockholm
- Gustaf Vasa Church, Stockholm
- Hedvig Eleonora Church, Stockholm
- Katarina Church, Stockholm
- Klara Church, Stockholm
- Maria Magdalena Church, Stockholm
- Oscar's Church, Stockholm
- Storkyrkan, Stockholm
- Strängnäs Cathedral
- Uppsala Cathedral
- Västerås Cathedral
- Växjö Cathedral
- Visby Cathedral

== United Kingdom ==
- St Anne and St Agnes, London
- St George's German Lutheran Church, London
- Savoy Chapel, London
- Nordic churches in London, London
- German Protestant Church, Greenheys, now Stephen Joseph Studio
