= Redeemer Lutheran Church =

Redeemer Lutheran Church may refer to:

- Redeemer Lutheran Church (Victoria, British Columbia)
- Redeemer Lutheran Church (Elmhurst, Illinois)
- Lutheran Church of the Redeemer, Jerusalem
