= Groß Ellershausen =

Village in Germany

Coordinates: 51°31′N 9°52′E

Groß Ellershausen (German pronunciation: [ɡʁoːsˌʔɛlɐsˈhaʊzn̩]) is a village (borough: Ortsteil) in Göttingen, Germany. The village lies on highway B3, west of the southern part of the city proper, separated from it and the River Leine by the Autobahn A7. Further west, just beyond the village is the 77 hectare local forest, Genossenschaftsforst Groß Ellershausen. From the village, running north and then through the forest is a bicycle- cum foot-path built on the old Hannöversche Südbahn railway line.

== History ==
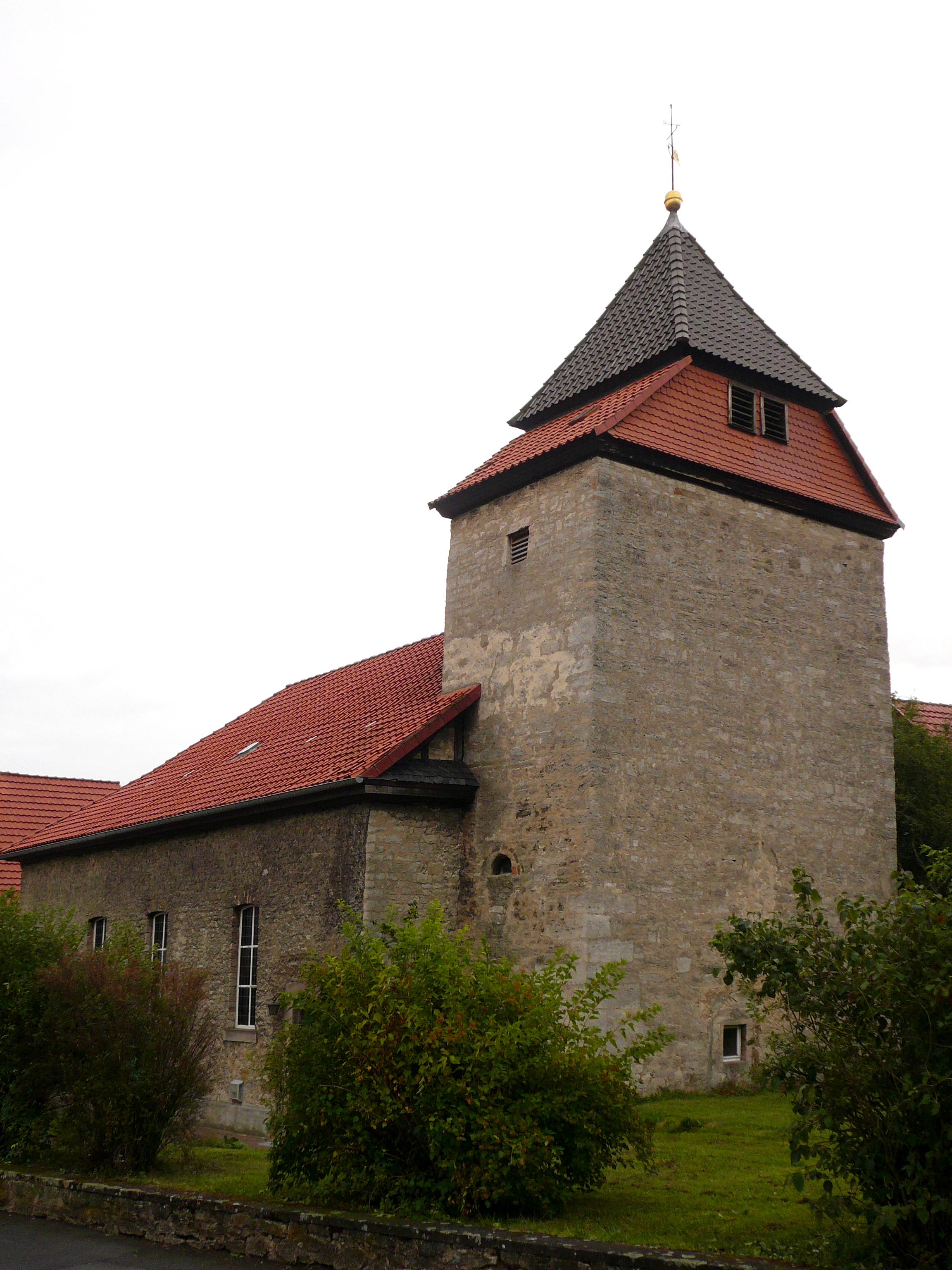
St. Martin's Church in Groß Ellershausen, the steeple was built in the 10th or 11th century.

As long ago as the early Neolithic, the present area of the village held settlements, as witnessed by the large number of LBK findings.

The earliest written record of the village is from the year 989 in the Traditiones Corbeyenses of the Corvey Abbey (III § B 115b), where it is called "Aliershusun". The village church was built in the 11th century, and is one of the oldest structures in southern Lower Saxony. In 1144, the village was presented to the Bursfelde Abbey. In a record from 1574, the earliest record of the name "Ellershausen" can be found.

During the Thirty Years War, the village suffered the depredations of war and pillage common to the era and area. Once again, in the Seven Years' War, the village was brutally used by Freikorps Fischer.

The village has suffered more than once the ravages of floodwaters. The earliest known such disastrous flooding was on 29 April 1800, with damaging high water also coming in August 2007.

Through the 19th century the village was an agricultural community that also profited from the orderly exploitation of the village woodland. A few craftsmen also plied their trades. In 1856, the (Ib.) Hannöversche Südbahn was completed, with the line passing through the community. However, it was not until 1931 that trains stopped at the village. In 1980, the line was discontinued. By this time, bus service and possession of personal automobiles were commonplace and extensive, and a significant proportion of the villagers were commuters to work or school in nearby Göttingen.

In 1932, the village had the word Gross added to it, to distinguish it from Ellershausen vor dem Walde near Hanover. The village was incorporated into Göttingen in 1973.

== Economy ==
There are over fifty businesses in the village.

There is a volunteer fire department.

== Education ==
Younger children attend the Mittelbergschule, which also services Hetjershausen and Knutbühren. Older children attend school in Göttingen.

== Government ==
Mayor: Heidrun von der Heide

The Ortsrat has 4 CDU members and 5 members (including the mayor) from the SPD.

== Demographics ==
The population of the village stood at 1,421 in 2006.

== Religion ==
The community is, like the region in general, predominantly Lutheran. There is one church in the village, St. Martin's Church, built in the 10th or 11th century and said to be one of the oldest surviving structures in southern Lower Saxony. Administratively, the church is part of the Sprengel Hildesheim-Göttingen der Evangelisch-lutherischen Landeskirche Hannovers.

== Social aspects ==
Since at least the early 19th century, there have been a number of social facilities and societies and clubs in Groß Ellershausen.

- SV Gr. Ellershausen-Hetjershausen e.V (sports)(http://grelli.de/index.php?site=welcome)
- Heimatverein Groß Ellershausen (local history)
- DRK Ortsverein Groß Ellershausen/Hetjershausen e.V. (local branch of the German Red Cross)
- Kyffhäuser Kameradschaft Groß Ellershausen
- Junggesellenverein von 1833 Groß Ellershausen
- Der Jugendraum (Disco 2000) von Groß Ellershausen.
- Previously there were women's choir, Ehrendamen des Gesangvereins Germania Ellershausen, and a men's cycling club, Wanderlust.
