= Christian Ackermann =

German sculptor and carver

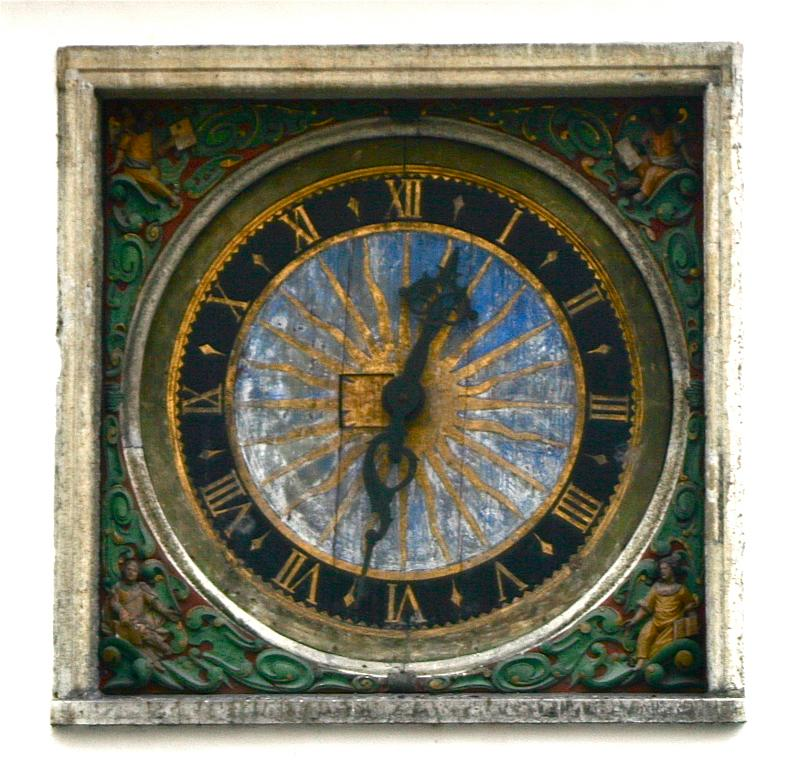
Clock at the Church of the Holy Ghost, Tallinn, created by Ackermann

Christian Ackermann was a sculptor and carver who worked in Estonia.

== Life and work ==
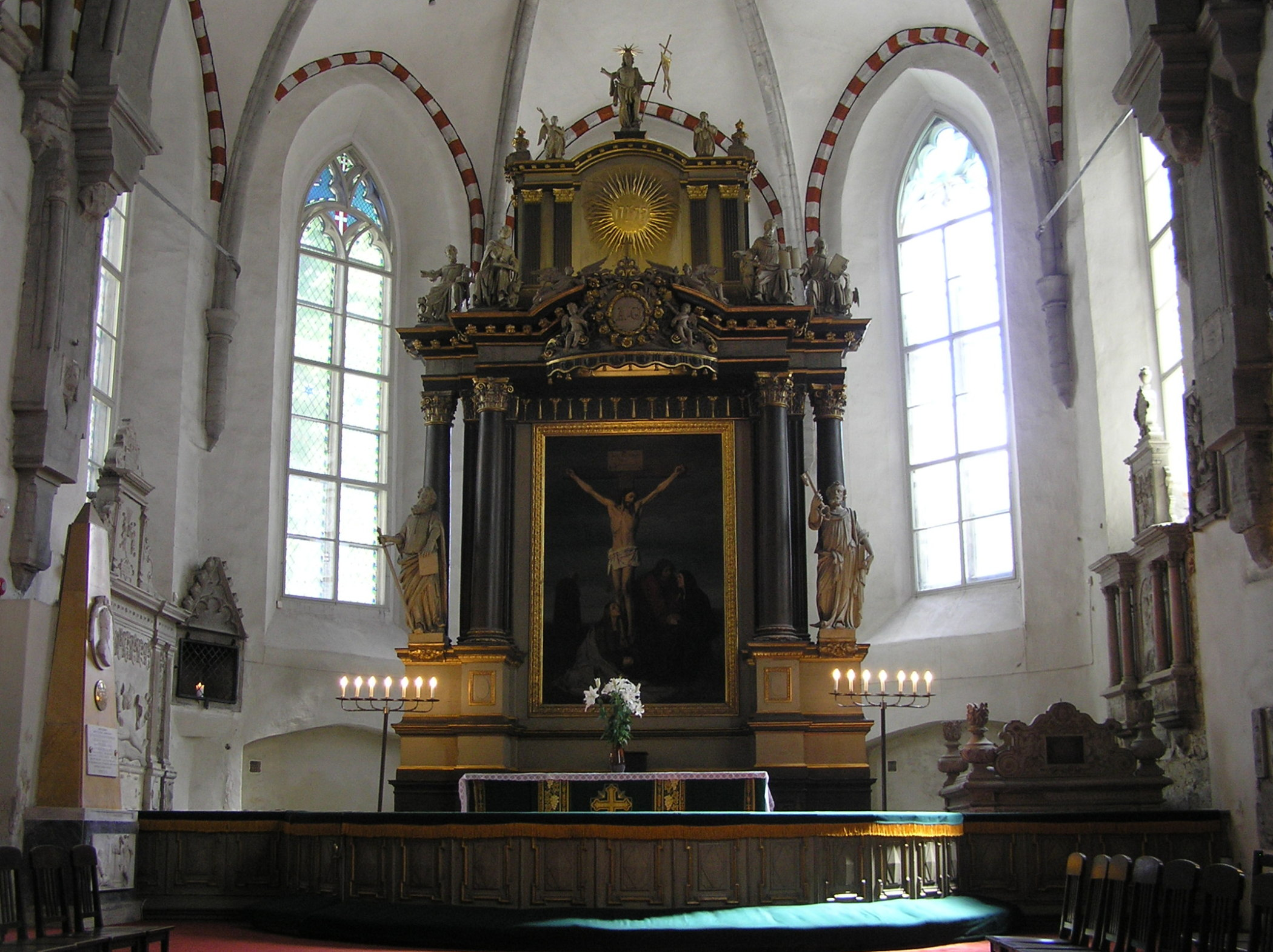
Altarpiece of St Mary's Cathedral, Tallinn

Christian Ackermann was born in Königsberg. He worked in Riga, Stockholm, and Gdańsk, before becoming active in Tallinn from about 1672 until his death in 1710. In 1675, Ackermann moved to Tallinn and worked first in the workshop of Elert Thiele, a local woodcarver. After Thiele's death in 1674, Achermann married the master's widow. He then became a citizen of Tallinn but didn't join the local guild of woodcarvers. And that was a reason why between him and the guild's masters had begun a strong struggle which finished in court. Ackermann won and got the permission to work alone, he was the first independent sculptor in Estonia and acquired his own workshop at Toompea Hill. He probably died either in 1710 or a short time later from plague.

Christian Ackermann was one of the greatest masters of the Baroque style in Estonia. He brought strong Central European influences to Northeast Europe, in particular the motifs of the Baroque and masterful Acanthus ornaments. The majority of his works consists of almost twenty altarpieces, pulpits and large coat-of-arms epitaphs.

== Most important works ==
- Baptistery for the Swedish St. Michael's Church in Tallinn (around 1680)

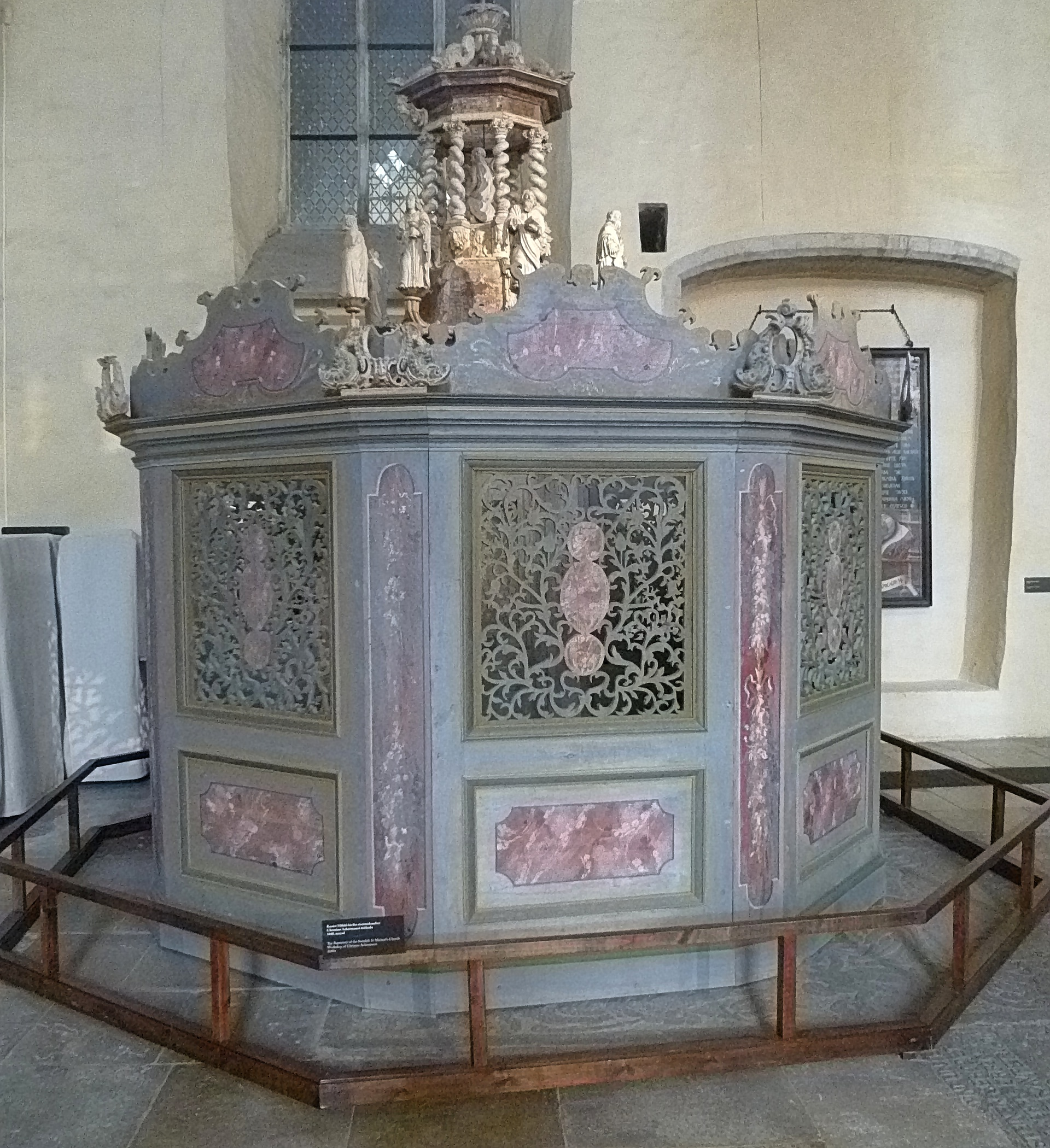
Baptistery of the Swedish St. Michael's Church (1680s)

- Altarpiece for the church of Simuna (1684)
- Altar and pulpit for the church of Türi (1693)
- Pulpit with figures of the apostles (1686) and altarpiece (1696) for St Mary's Cathedral of Tallinn
- Emblem for St Mary's Cathedral of Tallinn
- Clock for the Church of the Holy Ghost in Tallinn
- Altar figures and altarpiece for the church of Martna
- Pulpit for the church of Juuru Parish (1695)
- Pulpit for the church of Karuse (1697)
- Crucifix for the church of Koeru Parish (end of the 17th century)

== See also ==
- List of Baltic German artists
