= Knutbühren =

Coordinates: 51°32′N 9°49′E

Knutbühren (German pronunciation: [ˈknuːtˌbyːʁən]) is a village in southern Lower Saxony, Germany. It is a western borough of Göttingen. Administratively, it forms a unit (here, Ortschaft) with Groß Ellershausen and Hetjershausen.

There were 128 residents in 2024.
