= St. Martin's Church, Groß Ellershausen =

St. Martin's Church
- German: Sankt Martinikirche
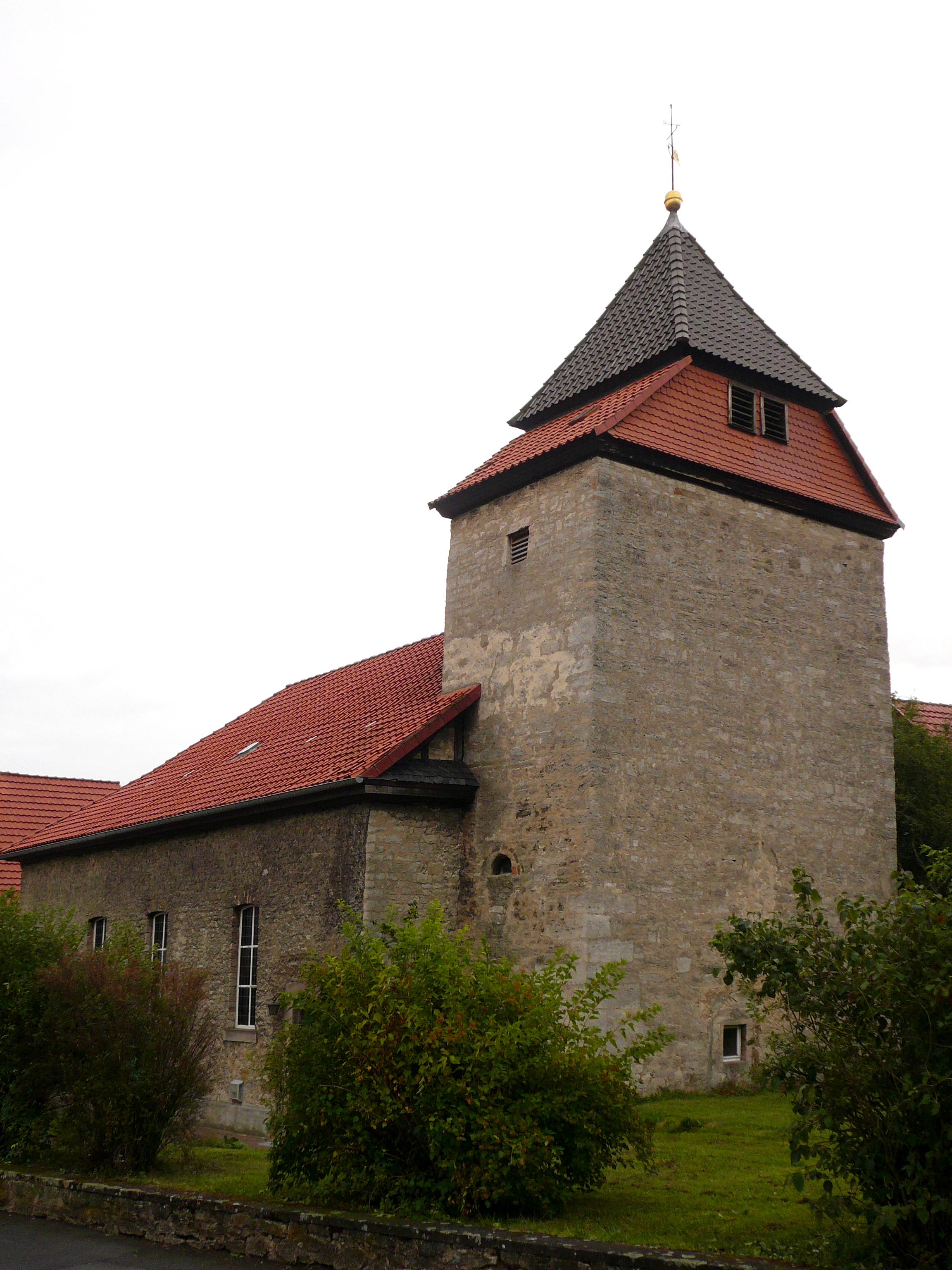
- St. Martin's Church, Groß Ellershausen

- Location within Lower Saxony Location within Germany
- 51°31′14″N 09°51′53″E
- Location: Groß Ellershausen, Göttingen
- Country: Germany
- Denomination: Lutheran
- Previous denomination: Catholic
- Website: www.kirche.gross-ellershausen.de

History
- Status: parish church
- Dedication: Martin of Tours

Architecture
- Functional status: active
- Completed: 11th century

Administration
- Deanery: Göttingen
- Parish: Groß Ellershausen

St. Martin's (German: St. Martini) is a Lutheran church in Groß Ellershausen, Göttingen, Lower Saxony, Germany. It is significant as possibly retaining the oldest existing structure, its tower, in southern Lower Saxony. While the details of the origin of the church building have been lost in the mist of history, architectural analysis indicates that the Romanesque church tower was most likely built in the tenth or eleventh century. The remains of a hearth on the second floor have led to the conclusion that the tower was originally a Wohnturm (a residential tower) of a titled family, probably the Herren von Ellershausen, which lived there at the time. The church's ship is much younger, probably having been built or re-built during the Barocque era. It was repaired in 1838. .

Records from 1608 and 1610 indicate there were two bells in the church. The larger of the two was melted down during the First World War as part of the national effort to obtain metals for military purposes. In 1922, two steel bells were dedicated as replacements. Then in 2003 three new bronze bells of unequal sizes were installed. Each of the bells has a Latin word inscribed (Soli, Deo and Gloria, meaning "only to God the honor"). The bells are rung by an electrically run system, with various combinations and sequences signifying various things.

It currently houses a Lutheran congregation.
