= Church of the Holy Spirit, Tallinn =

Church building in Tallinn, Estonia

- Parish Church of the Holy Spirit, Tallinn
- Estonian: Püha Vaimu kirik
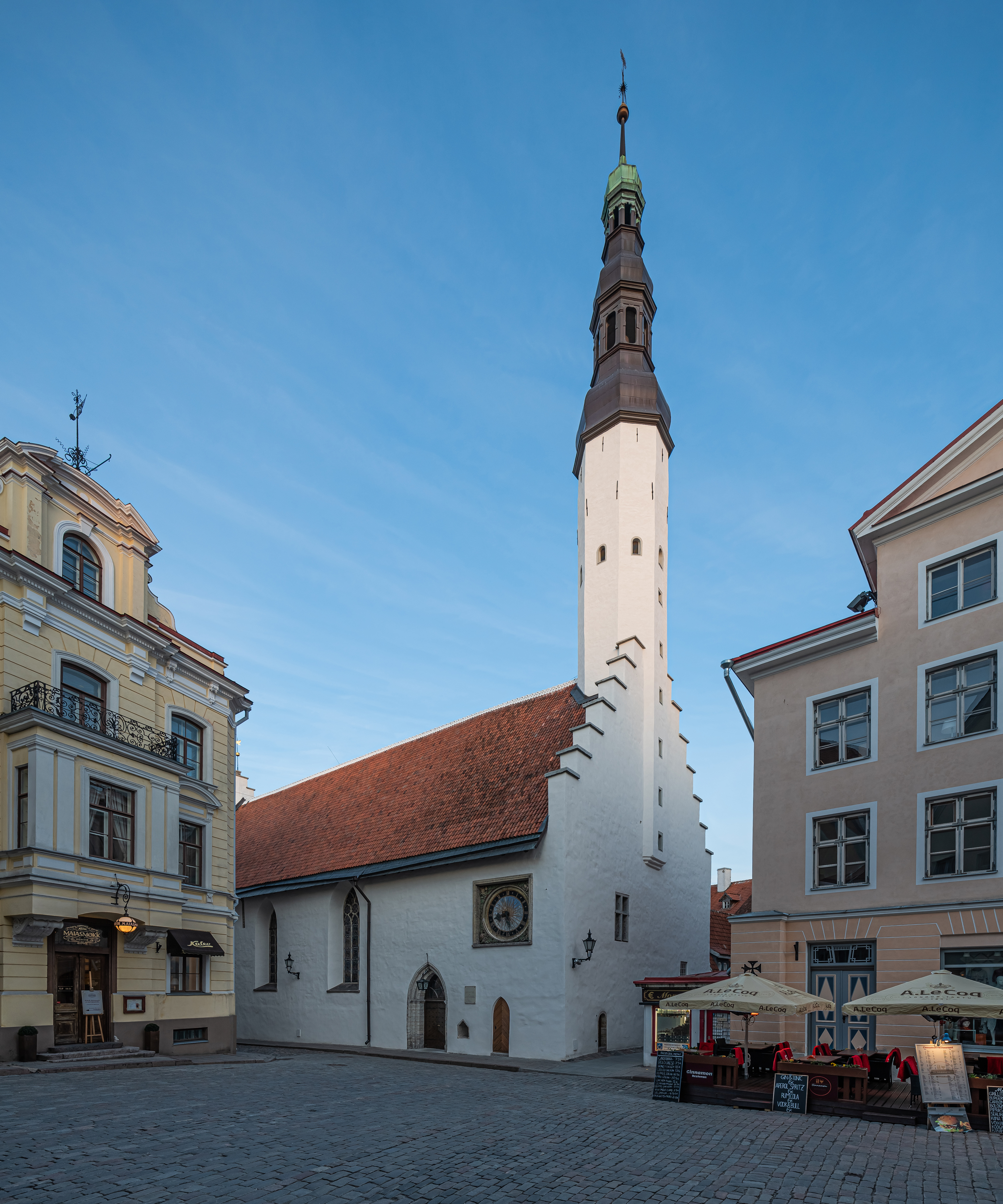
- Church of the Holy Spirit, Tallinn
- 59°26′17″N 24°44′45″E
- Location: Vanalinn, Tallinn, Harju County
- Address: Pühavaimu 2
- Country: Estonia
- Language: Estonian
- Denomination: Lutheran
- Previous denomination: Catholic
- Website: www.puhavaimu.ee

History
- Status: Active
- Founded: before 1319
- Dedication: Holy Spirit

Architecture
- Functional status: Parish Church
- Heritage designation: Kultuurimälestis (no. 1196)
- Designated: 20 September 1995
- Architectural type: Hall church
- Style: Gothic
- Groundbreaking: before 1319
- Completed: 1380

Administration
- Diocese: Tallinn
- Deanery: Tallinn

Clergy
- Archbishop: Urmas Viilma
- Priest(s): Gustav Peeter Piir; Eha Kraft; Kaido Petermann

The Church of the Holy Ghost or Church of the Holy Spirit (Estonian: Püha Vaimu kirik, German: Heiliggeistkirche) is a medieval Lutheran church in the old town district of Tallinn, Estonia. It is located behind Raekoja plats, and lies opposite the Great Guild and Maiasmokk, Tallinn's oldest café.

== History ==
Building of the church probably started sometime during the first half of the 13th century, and the church is mentioned in written sources for the first time in 1319. The fact that the church does not face due east may suggest that it was erected in an already built-up area and had to adapt to the street layout. Originally the church was part of a greater almshouse complex, and dedicated to the Holy Ghost, and apart from the main entrance on the north side of the church, there was also an entrance from the almshouse yard, on the south side of the church.

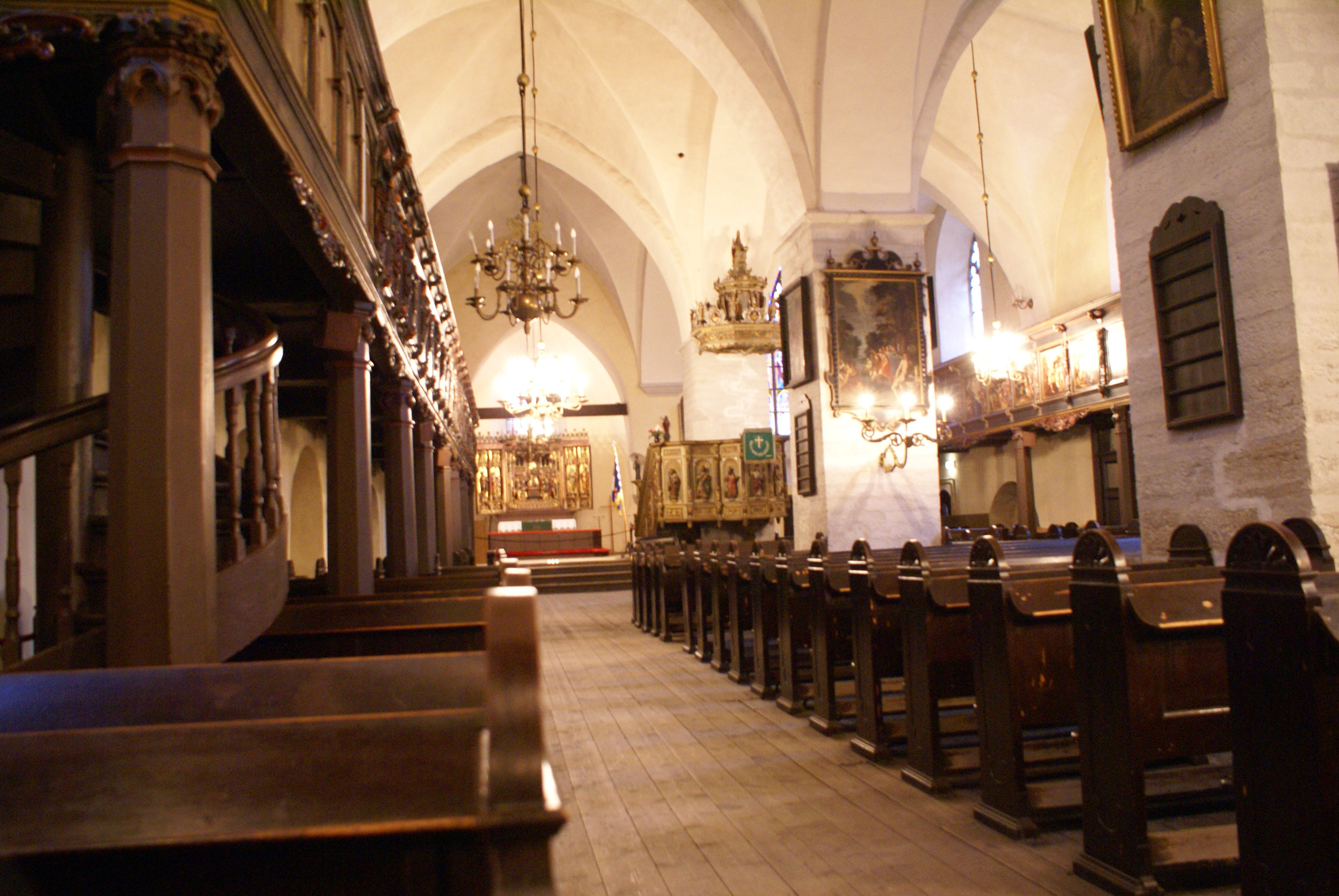
Interior of the church

The oldest part of the church is the choir, to which the aisle was added sometime in the late 13th century or early 14th century. The original wooden ceiling was replaced in 1360, when the present vaulting, tower and large gothic windows were added. In 1630, the tower received its current appearance, which however is a reconstruction as the tower was ravaged by fire in both 1684 and 2002. The church was the first church in Estonia to hold services in Estonian, and the first extracts of the catechism to be published in Estonian were printed here in 1535.

Chronicler Balthasar Russow (1536-1600) was a pastor of the church.

== Architecture ==
The church has a plain, white-washed exterior with crow-stepped gables, an octagonal tower with the above-mentioned reconstructed renaissance spire and few but rather large Gothic windows with fine stone dressing. The stained glass windows are late 20th century. Most noteworthy in the exterior is the finely carved clock, a work by Christian Ackermann (late 17th century).

The layout of the interior is somewhat unusual, with the choir located asymmetrically to the north and a two-aisled nave. Of the interior decoration, especially the remarkable main altar, a work by Bernt Notke, is noteworthy. It dates from 1483 and depicts, on the central panel, the descent of the Holy Ghost on the twelve apostles at Pentecost. The galleries in the church are richly decorated with scenes from the Bible, painted in the mid-17th century and probably by different artists. Of more recent origin is the organ, dating from 1929, and a commemorative plaque next to the altar, put up in memory of British sailors who lost their lives during the British campaign in the Baltic (1918–1919).

== Gallery ==
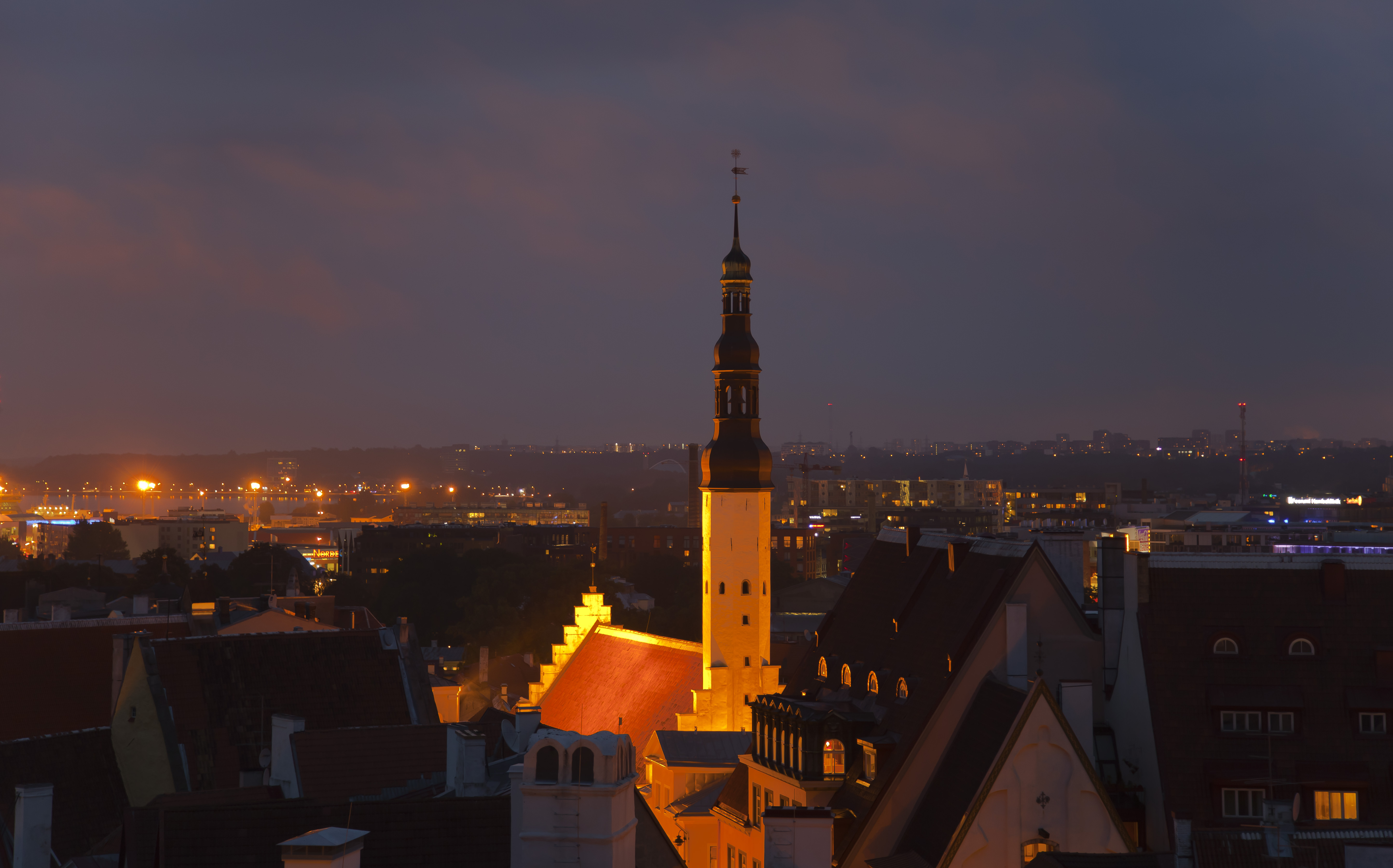
The tower of the church at night

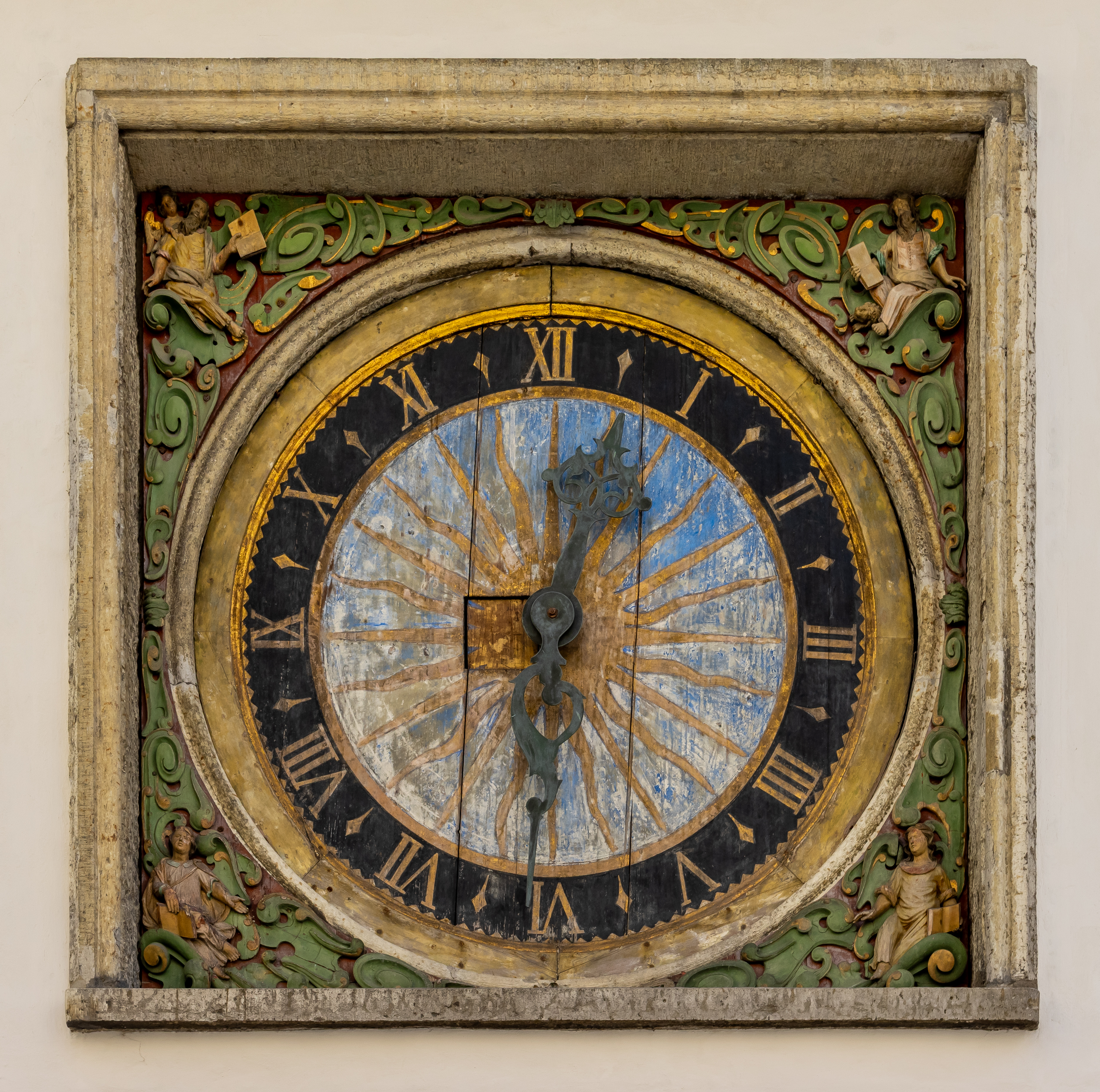
Clock of the Church of the Holy Ghost in Tallinn, made by Christian Ackermann

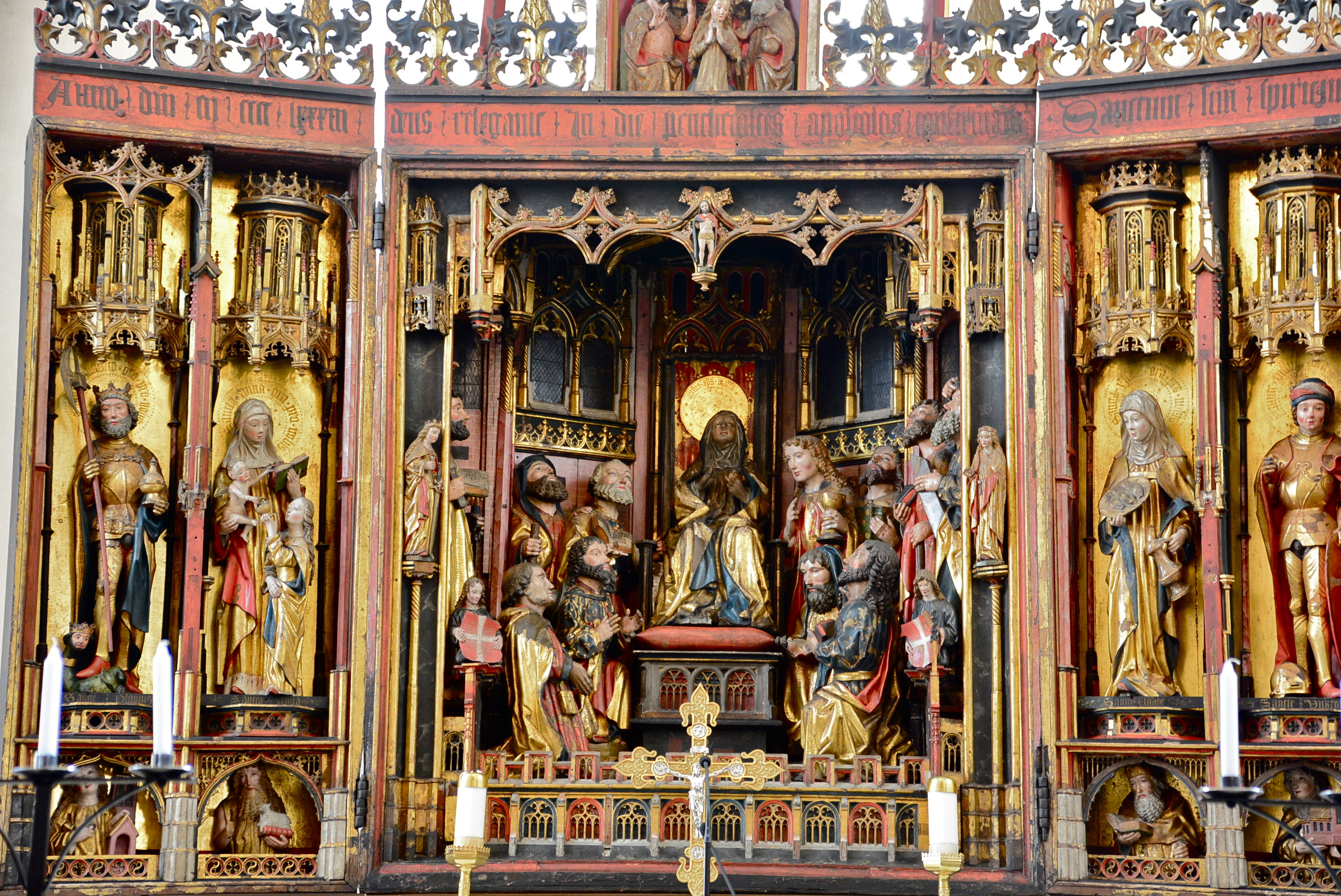
The main altar, by Bernt Notke (1483)

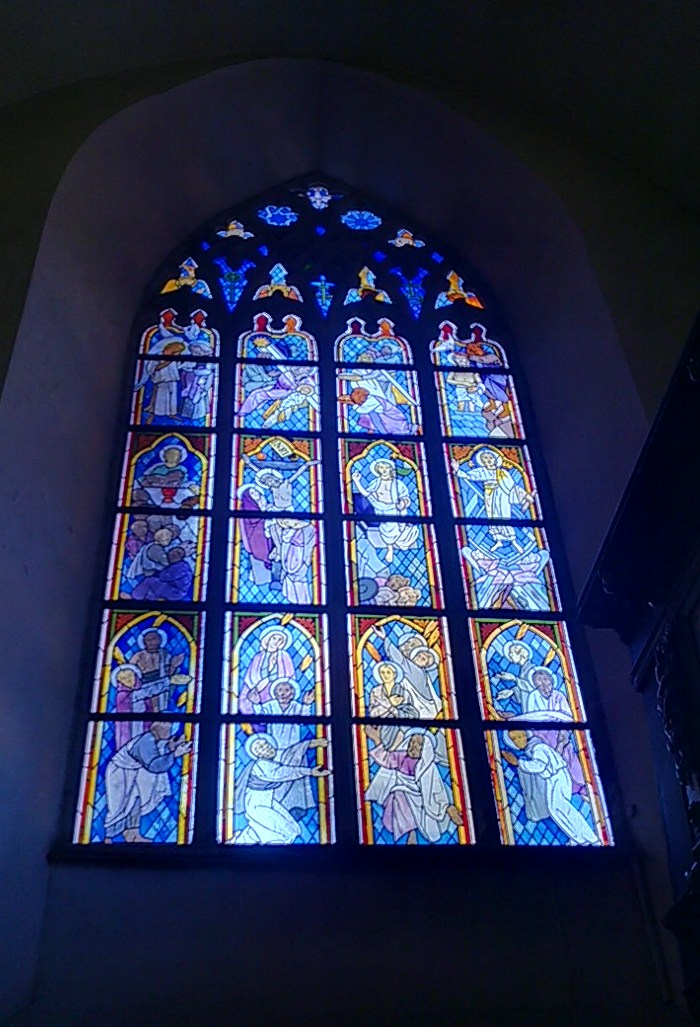
Stained glass window
