= The Lutheran Church of the Holy Catherine =

Religious building preserved in Omsk, Russia

Coordinates: 54°59′02″N 73°22′09″E

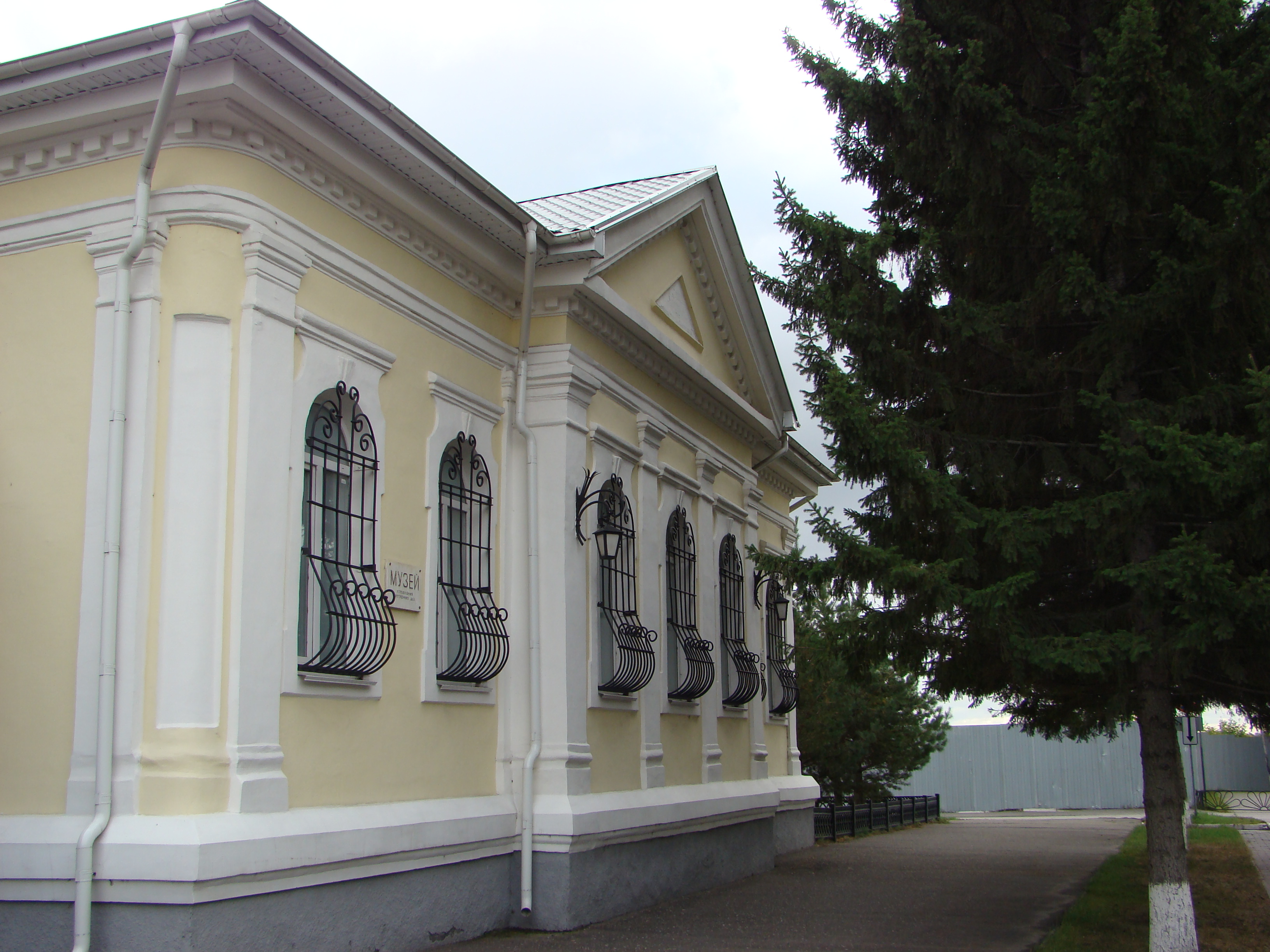
Church of the Holy Catherine

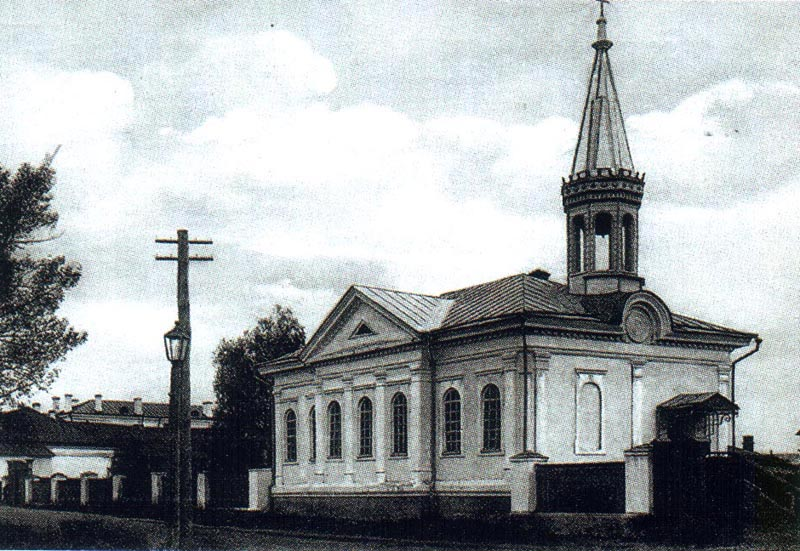
The church before 1917

The Lutheran Church of the Holy Catherine (Russia, Omsk) is a unique religious building of the 18th century, preserved in Omsk. The church was built in 1790—1792 for the needs of foreign Protestants, who worked in the governance of Siberian corps and Omsk fortress.

== Appearance ==
The Church is situated on the east side of the square parade ground in a fortress in the city center, near the Irtysh River. This building is an architectural monument of the late Siberian baroque. The movement of architectural forms, flexibility, richness of stucco give emphasis and put it among the best architectural monuments of Omsk of the 18th century. The project was completed in the military office of the Siberian Corps, commanded by Lieutenant-General I.I. Springer. This church represents a baroque rectangular building with a large semi-circular altar. The main facade has centrally symmetric composition: in the middle there is a risalit, cutting through three arched windows with responders between them and completing by the gable, side parts have two arched windows, rounded corners and pilaster side. The entry of the church was on the south side. Initially it had a doorway with columns, and later the church kept the high porch with rampart of ornately shaped trellis-work and canopy with elegant hammered metal consoles. Until the late 19th century, over the building there was the baroque octagonal tower with a dome. Later the Gothic tower was built in 1906—1908 over it. These changes in the appearance of the building connected with the peculiarities of the national identity of the Lutherans. Therefore, the replacement of the international Baroque style in the forms of towers for the Gothic one was made with an intention to give the church more 'German' appearance. But it demounted in 1970. Decorative elements: The walls are smooth with pilasters, cornice is anfractuous. Semicircular windows are decorated with architraves. Interior is not preserved.

== History ==
There were many outstanding parishioners such as state and local officials. For instance, the Governor-General of the Western Siberia between 1851 and 1861 Gustav Hristianovich Gasford (1794—1874) who was the hero of the War of 1812, a member of the military campaigns in the Caucasus, Poland and Austria-Hungary. During his reign in Siberia Zailiyskiy region and other large territories were joined, changes in the Siberian Cossack Host were made, 80,000 immigrants were inducted from European part of Russia, 200 churches were built, many schools were opened. Such eminent architects as Frederick Fridrihovich Wagner (1821—1876) and Edward I. Ezet (1838—1892) were also parishioners of the church of the Holy Catherine.
