= St. Luke's Church, Munich =

St. Luke's Church
- Sankt Lukas
- St. Luke's on the banks of the Isar

- Location within Bavaria Location within Germany
- 48°08′06″N 11°35′14″E
- Location: Munich
- Country: Germany
- Denomination: Lutheran
- Website: www.sanktlukas.de

History
- Status: parish church
- Dedication: Luke the Evangelist
- Dedicated: first Advent 1896

Architecture
- Functional status: active
- Architect: Albert Schmidt
- Style: Historicism
- Groundbreaking: 29 June 1893
- Completed: first Advent 1896

Specifications
- Materials: Brick

Administration
- Deanery: Munich and Upper Bavaria (Kirchenkreis)
- Parish: Lukasgemeinde Munich

St. Luke's Church (German: St. Lukas or Lukaskirche) is the largest Protestant church in Munich, southern Germany. It was built in 1893–96 and designed by Albert Schmidt. It is the only pre-World War II Lutheran parish church building remaining in the historic section of central Munich.

St. Luke's is located on the banks of the Isar, between the Steinsdorfstraße and Mariannenplatz. The address of the grounds is on Mariannenplatz (Mariannenplatz 3), while the main entrance is on the Steinsdorfstraße. The two eastern bell towers and the almost 64-meter-high dome are prominent features. Although the large church is nicknamed Dom der Münchner Protestanten (Cathedral of the Munich Protestants), St. Luke's is not a seat of a bishop (cathedra).

== History and description ==
The history of Protestant churches in Munich is comparatively recent. The first Protestant groups early in the 16th century were banned and suppressed. The Electorate of Bavaria was predominantly Catholic under the reigning Wittelsbach family after the Reformation; but in 1799 the Wittelsbach head, Prince-elector Max IV Joseph, married Friederike Karoline Wilhelmine, a Lutheran princess, and there was suddenly a Protestant presence at court in Munich. Nineteenth-century Munich also became a city with a growing number of immigrants from other regions of Germany, many of them Lutherans.

In 1826, there were already 6,000 Lutheran parishioners in the city. The first Protestant church, St. Matthew, was inaugurated in 1833. It was demolished in 1938 by the Nazis and rebuilt after the World War II in another location. The second Protestant church, St Mark's, was inaugurated in 1877. By the last decades of the 19th century, Munich's Lutherans were in need of a third, and larger church. But the Bavarian royal family was concerned to protect the Catholic character of the city, therefore the Lutherans were given land on the banks of the river Isar to build St. Luke's. The first stone was laid on 29 June 1893 and the church was consecrated on the first Advent, 1896.

== Architecture and art ==
The architect Albert Schmidt has used pre-Reformation styles in order to please the Roman Catholic city rulers: The exterior architecture is built in Romanesque forms, while the interior is reminiscent of the early Rhenish Gothic based on the geometric shape of a Greek cross. In the east there is a three-sided apse, the western facade is seven-sided and has square towers.

St. Luke's had some artistically outstanding stained glass windows from 1896 to 1899, which had been created by the München Mayer'sche Hofkunstanstalt (Mayer's court art workshop Munich) after drafts of the Englishman Charles Dixon, one of the best-renowned glass painters of his time.

Those windows were destroyed irretrievably during the great air raid of 6/7 September 1943. The lost windows of the chancel were replaced by new ones by Hermann Kaspar in 1946. The altar painting is a work of the artist Gustav Adolf Goldberg, which is dedicated to the Entombment of Christ.

== Organ ==
The organ was built in 1932 by the G.F. Steinmeyer & Co. (Oettingen).

== Gallery ==
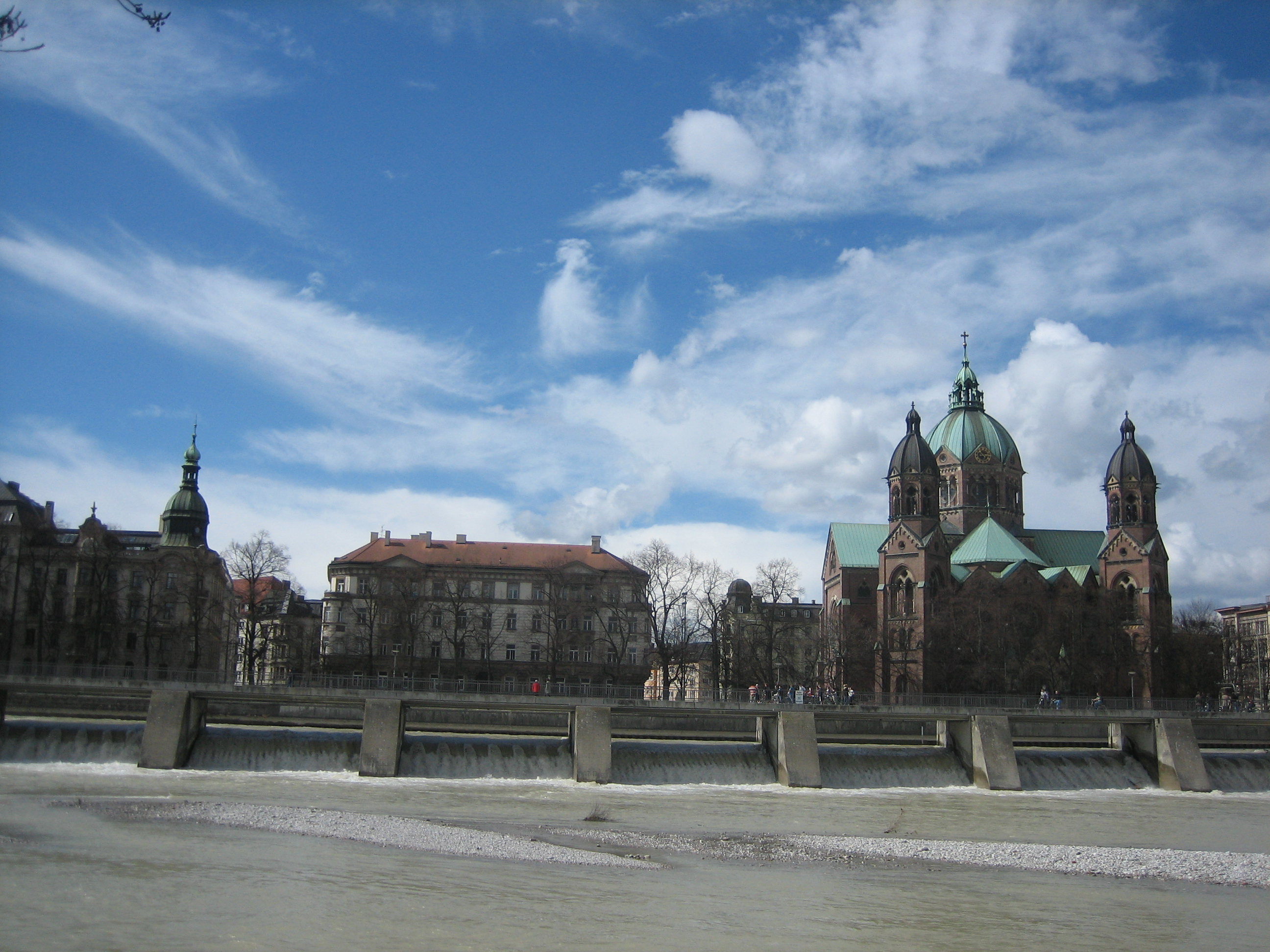
Weir on the River Isar with St. Luke's

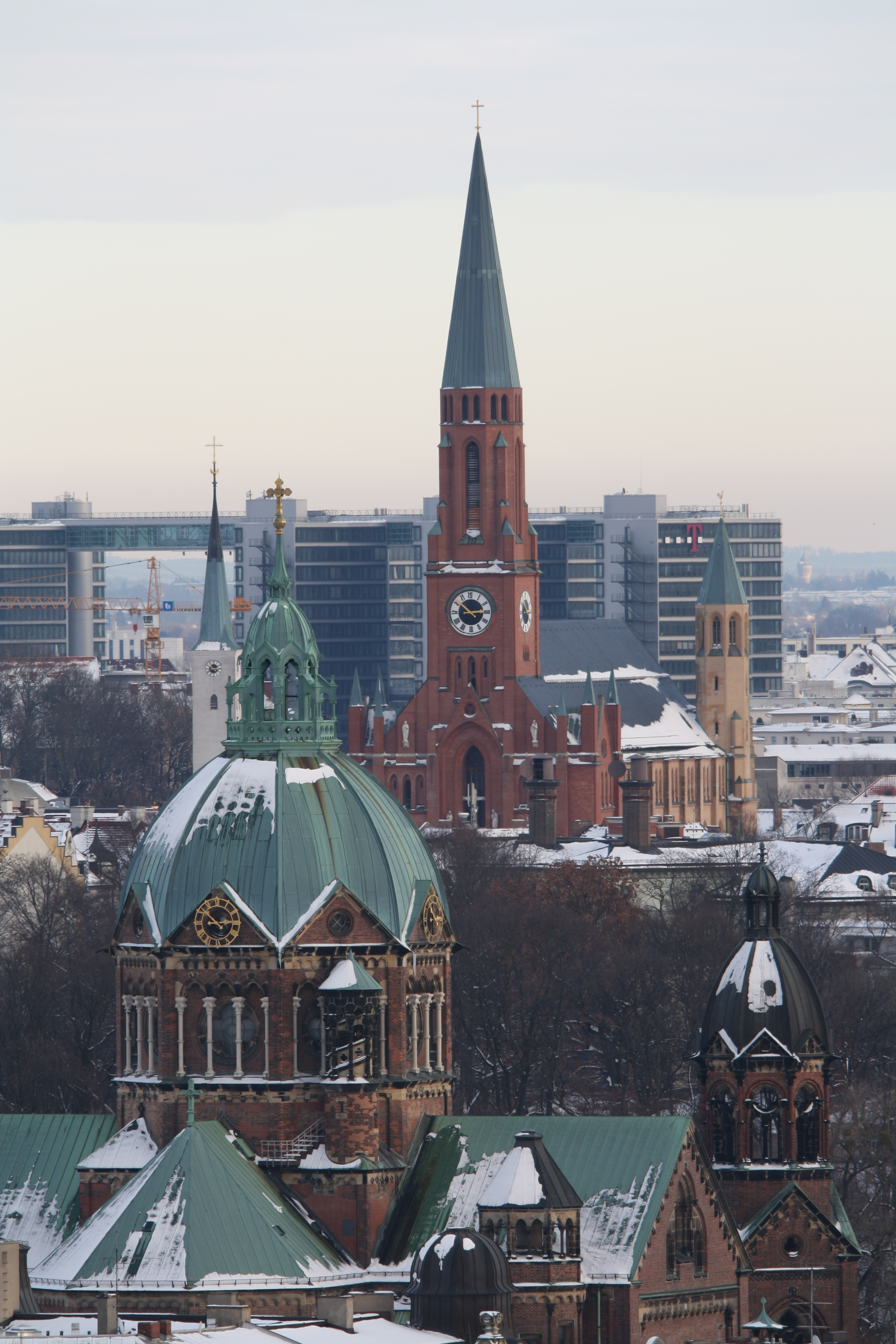
St. Luke's with the Roman Catholic church of St John the Baptist in the background

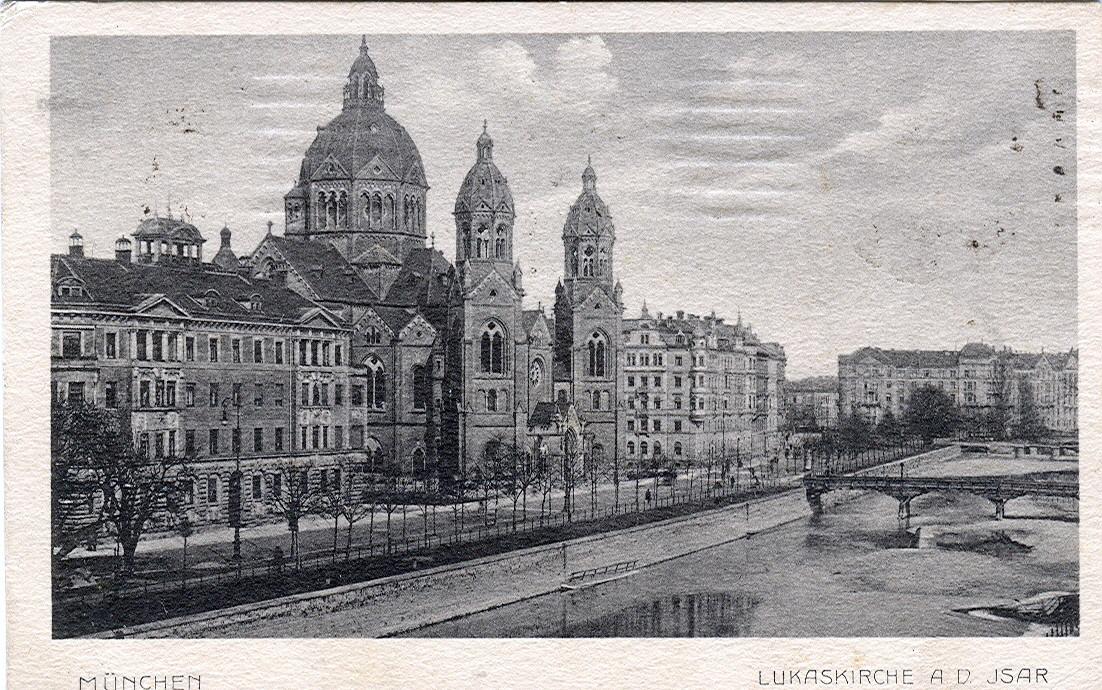
St. Luke's in 1918

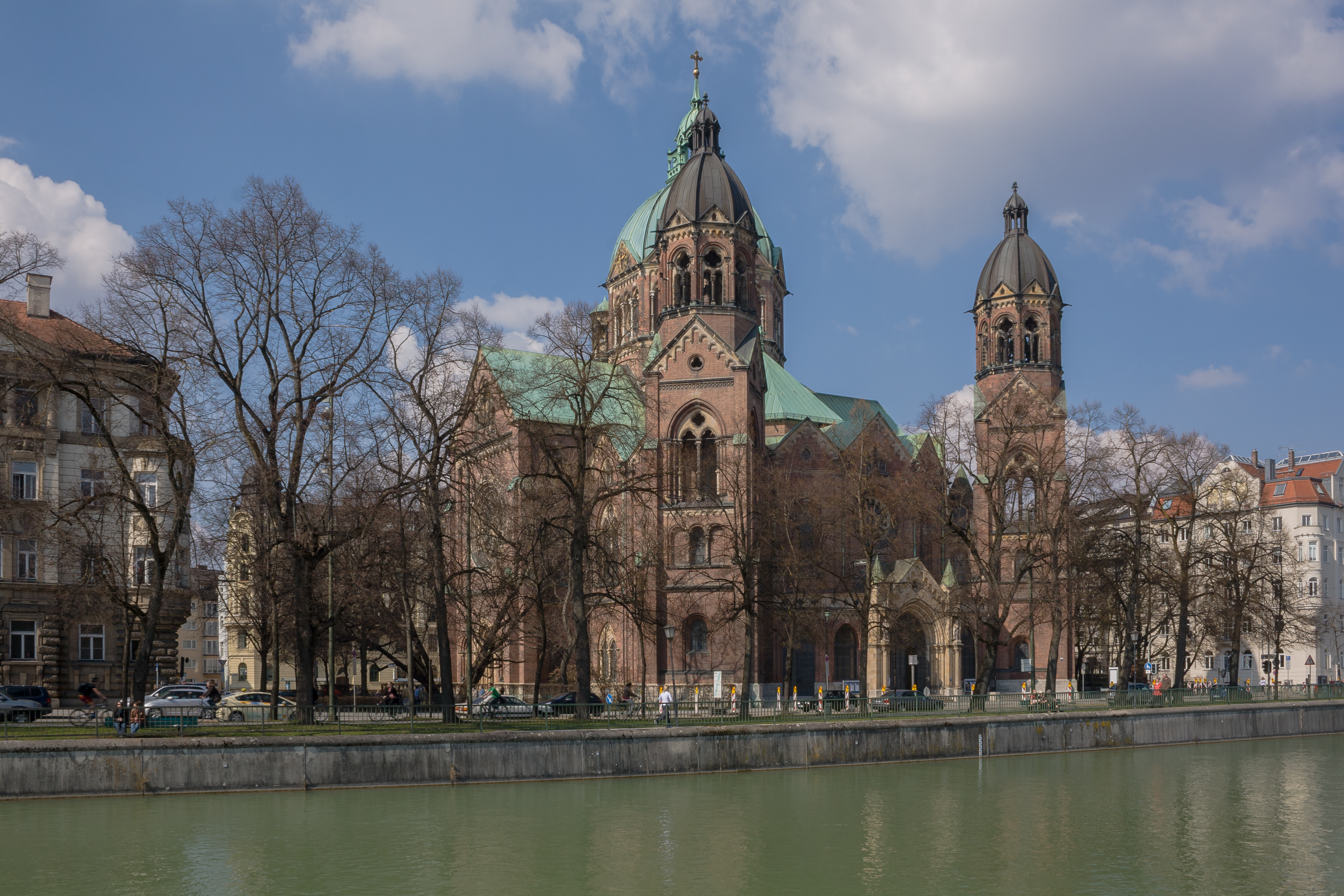
Exterior

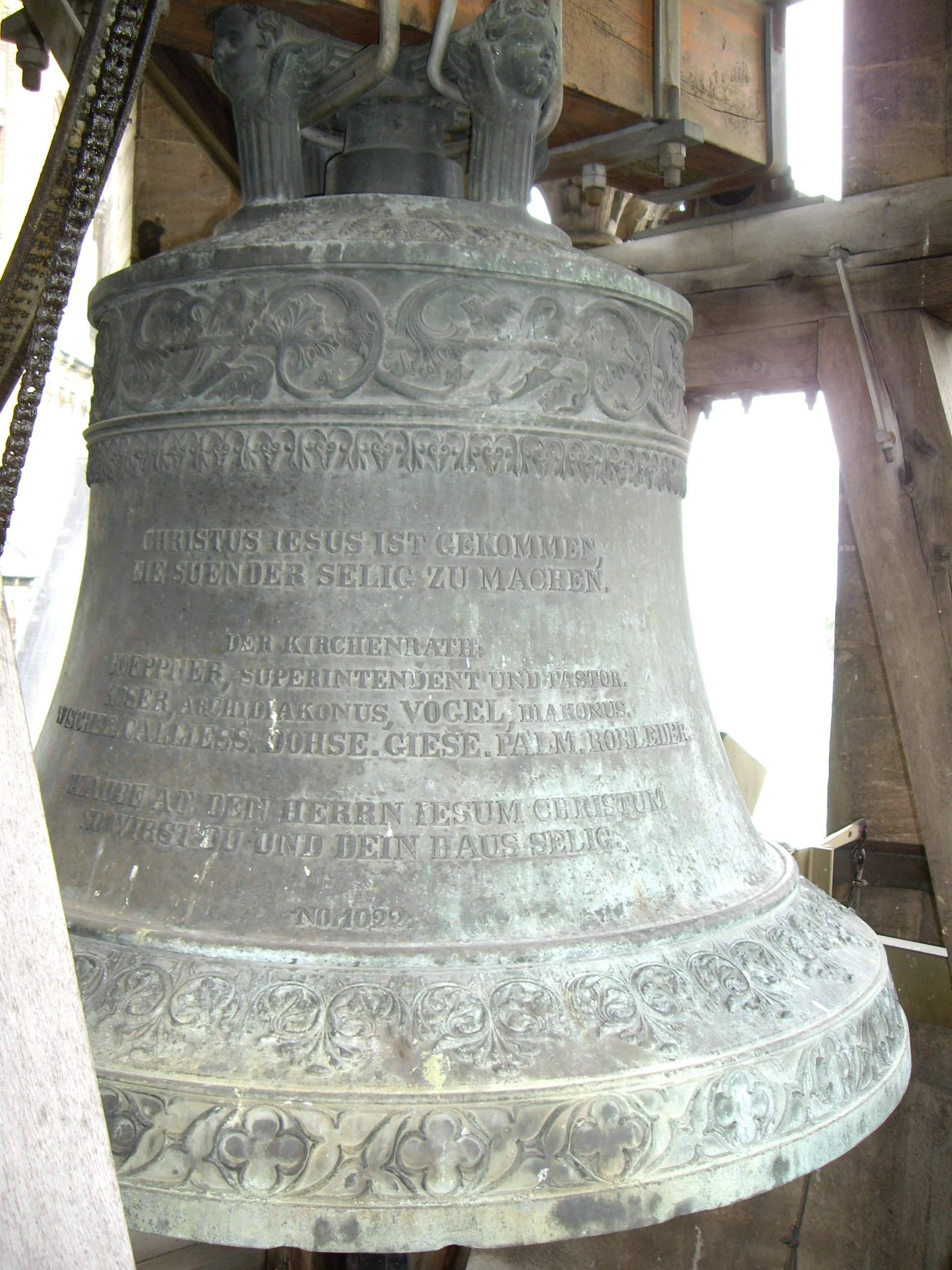
Inscriptions Bell, 1862

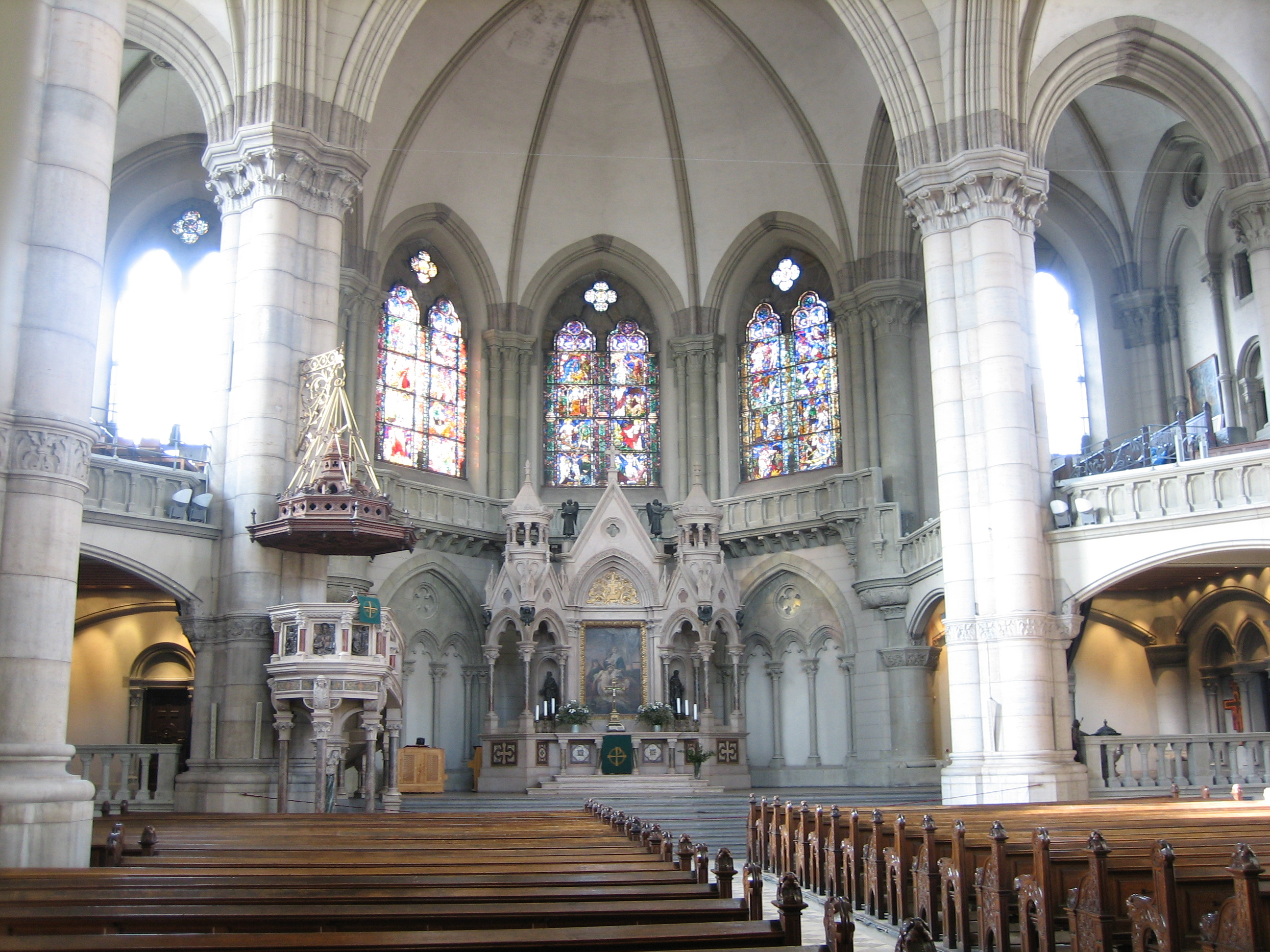
Interior

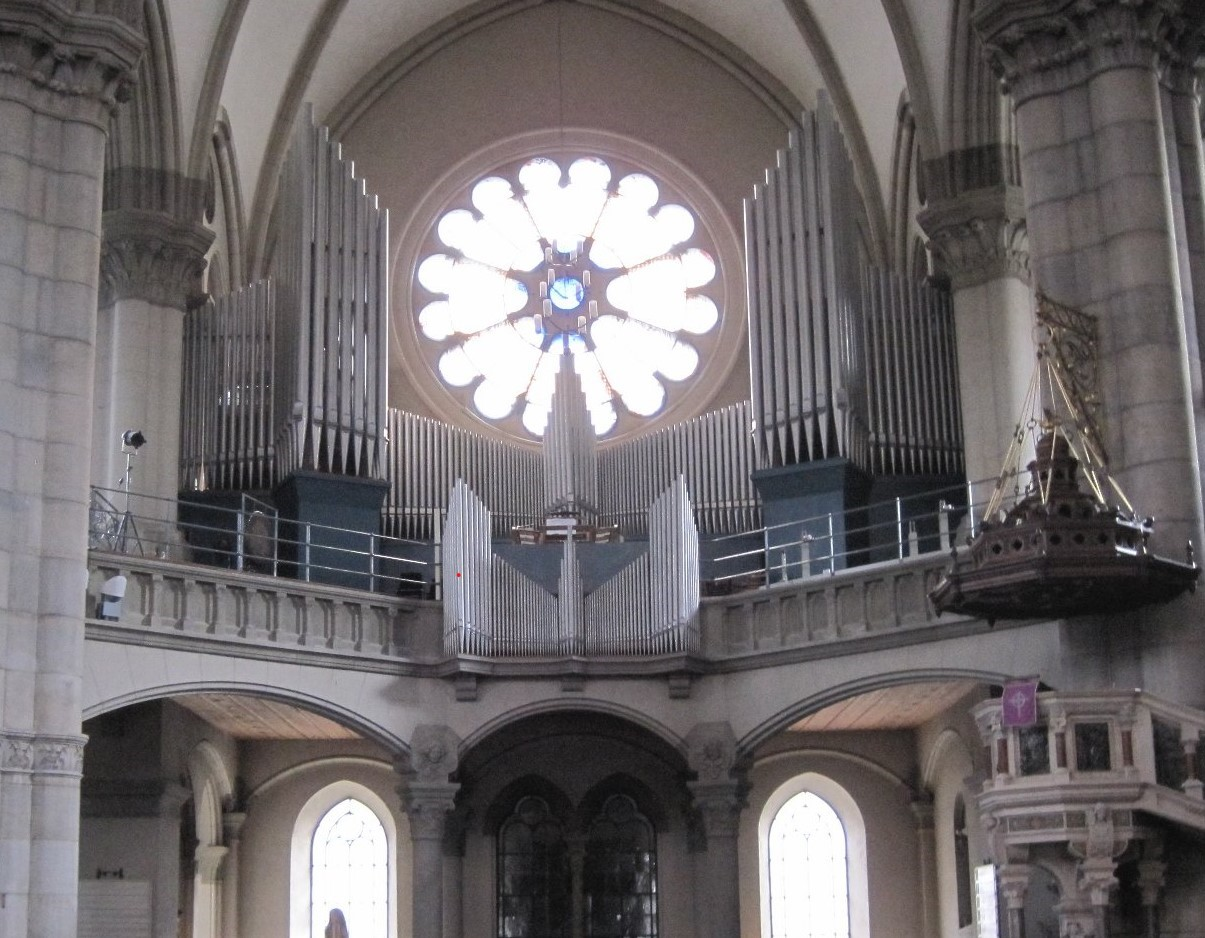
Organ

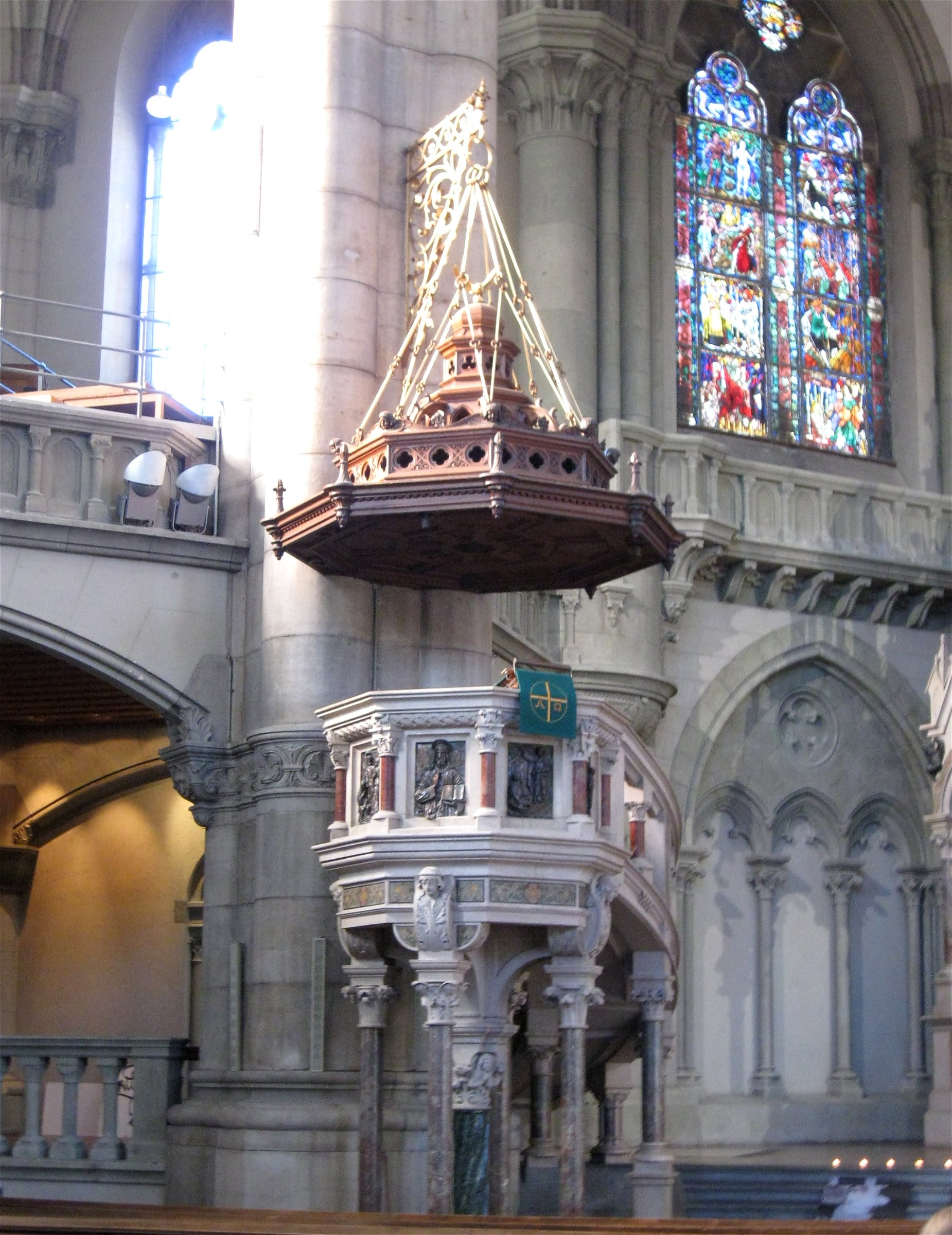
Pulpit

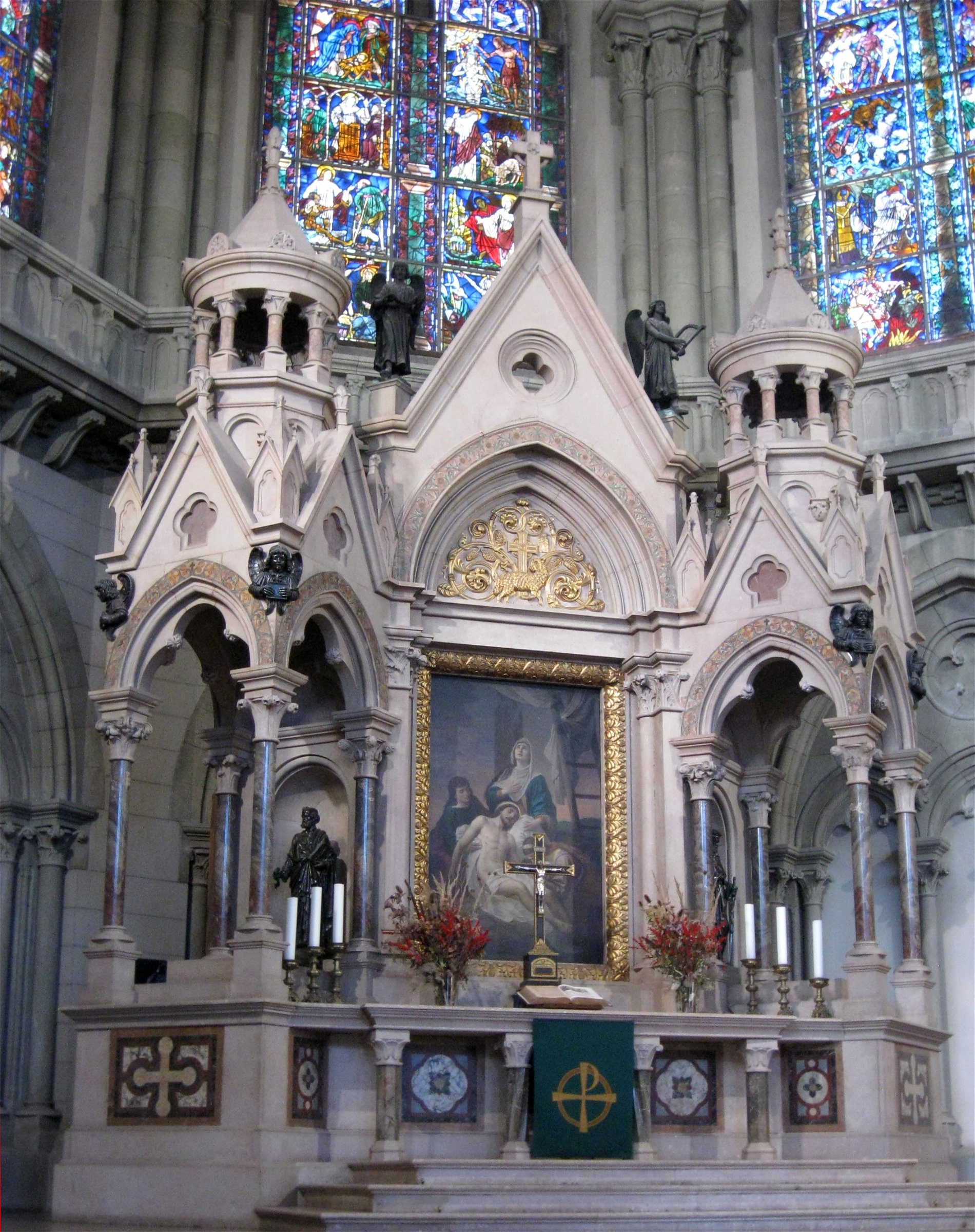
Altar
