= First Lutheran Church (Vancouver) =

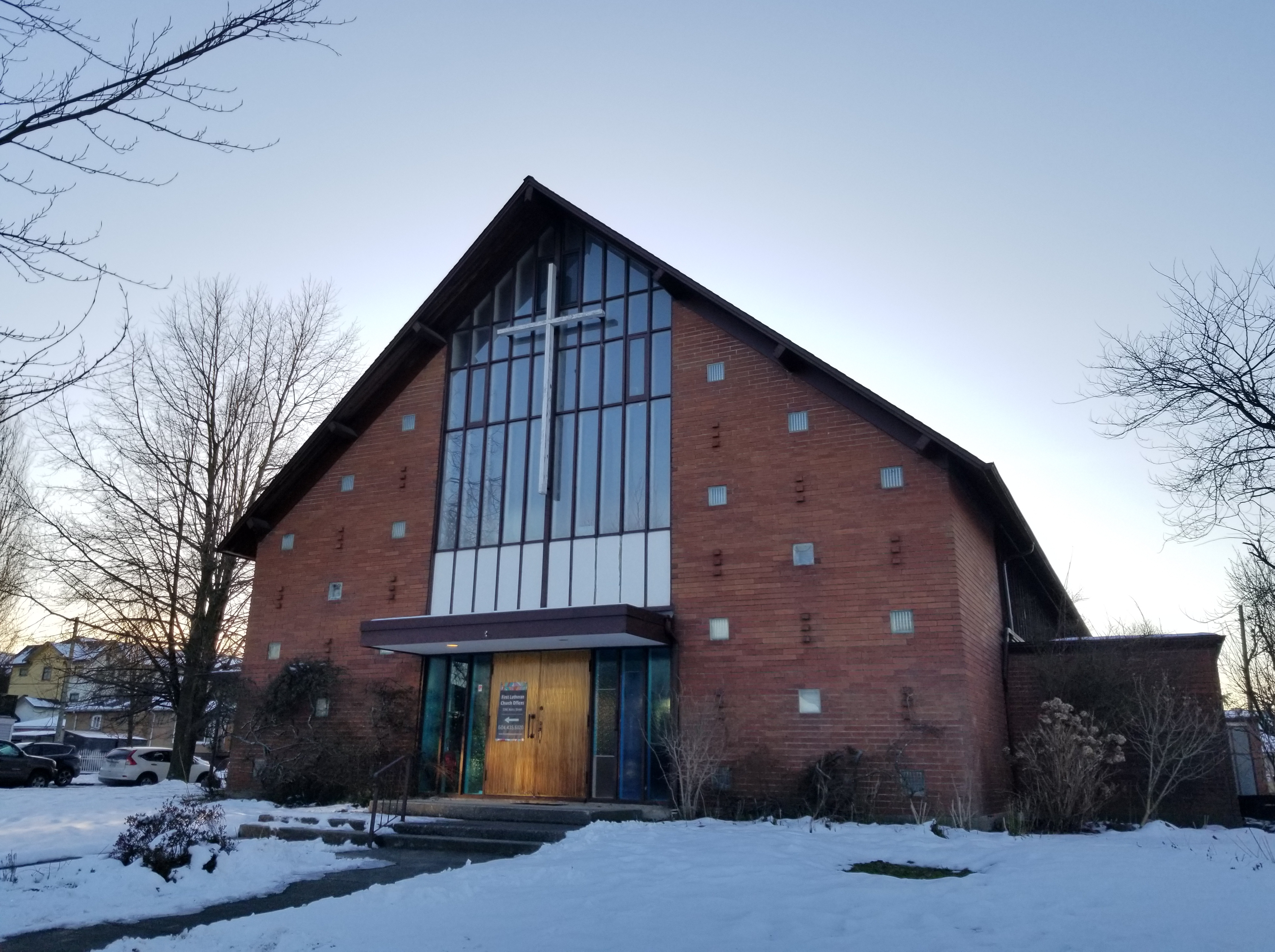
- The First Lutheran Church in 2025
- First Lutheran Church
- 49.2320°N 123.0522°W
- Location: Vancouver, British Columbia
- Country: Canada
- Denomination: Lutheran
- Website: First Lutheran Church

The First Lutheran Church is a Lutheran Church located in Vancouver, British Columbia, Canada. It gained local prominence in 2009 when Mikhail Lennikov, an ex-KGB officer, sought refuge within the church to avoid deportation back to his native Russia. He lived in the church with his family for six years before voluntarily leaving Canada in 2015. However, half a year later, a Canadian federal court overturned the ruling that rejected his request for humanitarian asylum, allowing him to return to the country.
