= Redeemer Lutheran Church (Elmhurst, Illinois) =

Church in Illinois, United States

Redeemer Evangelical Lutheran Church
- Redeemer Evangelical Lutheran Church
- 41°53′28″N 87°56′18″W
- Location: 345 S. Kenilworth Ave. Elmhurst, Illinois 60126
- Country: United States
- Denomination: Lutheran Church – Missouri Synod
- Website: redeemerlcms.com

History
- Founder: Rev. G. Schuessler
- Dedicated: May 18, 1930

Architecture
- Architect(s): Hotchkiss & Edgar
- Style: Neo-Baroque and Gothic
- Groundbreaking: October 1929
- Completed: May 1930

Redeemer Lutheran Church is a congregation of the Lutheran Church – Missouri Synod (LCMS) in Elmhurst, Illinois, a western suburb of Chicago. Founded in 1928, there were (as of 2008) 495 baptized members. Three of Redeemer's pastors held rather long tenures; Rev. Worth Setzer served for nearly 31 years, Rev. George Bornemann for 17 years, Rev. Richard Drews for 26 years. More recently, Rev. Scott Stiegemeyer served at Redeemer for five years; the current pastor is Rev. Anthony Oliphant, who was installed in the autumn of 2015.

This church is designed in a reserved mixture of Gothic and Neo-Baroque styles, and possesses artwork covering a number of different movements, including medieval-style stained glass, carved wooden doors, and a contemporary piece representing the Holy Spirit which hangs in the northern transept.

== History ==
=== Founding ===
Founded at an April 19, 1928 meeting at Hawthorne Elementary School, the congregation initially had only 22 English-language Lutheran members after splitting off from Immanuel Lutheran Church, which would only provide services in German. The first worship service had been held Easter Sunday, April 8, in the auditorium of the same school with attendees from Immanuel Lutheran Church and Trinity Lutheran Church of Villa Park, Illinois. Rev. H. H. Hartmann was the field missionary of the Northern Illinois District of the Evangelical Lutheran Synod of Missouri, Ohio, and Other States (the former name mostly German-speaking LCMS), and both he and Rev. H. Prange of Trinity Lutheran Church, Oak Park, provided the group with organizational guidance. By May 25 the core group had grown to 40 people, who approved a preliminary organization and elected officers.

The fledgling congregation chose to join the English District of the LCMS; the women members' recommendation of "Redeemer Evangelical Lutheran Church" was accepted as the congregation's name. The rolls were kept open for chartering members and were finalized with 109 people. Rev. G. Schuessler, president of the English District, arranged for visiting pastors to lead worship. In October 1928 the English District approved the new church's constitution and by-laws, thus chartering them as a congregation. On October 29, the group elected its first officers and committees. Dr. Edward Marquardt chaired a building committee, tasked with planning for the congregation's first purpose-built facility.

=== Church building ===
One set of carved wooden doors at the church

In January 1929 the group purchased land in an elm-shaded residential area at the northwest corner of Kenilworth Avenue and St. Charles Road as the future site for their church. In April of that year they hired the Hotchkiss & Edgar architectural partners, the same firm that had designed Immanuel Lutheran, to design the Elmhurst building, and held the groundbreaking ceremony on Sunday, October 20, 1929. The building was initially larger than was strictly required by the size of the congregation, but members expected the congregation to grow through missionary outreach.

The church building, described at the time as a restrained modern Gothic-style building, was complete by May 18, 1930, and was characterized as "one of the most attractive and imposing houses of worship in Elmhurst." Three worship services were planned for the dedication activities. At 10:45 a.m. Rev. W. F. Wilk of St. Louis preached, while Erwin Miller led Redeemer's choir. At 3:00 p.m. Rev. G. Schuessler, president of the English District, preached a sermon, while the St. John Lutheran Church choir of La Grange, Illinois, sang. LCMS vice-president Rev. William Dallmann preached at the 8:00 p.m. service, with singing by the West Suburban Male Quartet. On the three subsequent evenings services were led by English District vice-president Rev. E. F. Haertel; Rev. O. E. Geiseman, of Oak Park; and Rev. W. H. Prange, of Oak Park; with the St. John Lutheran male chorus providing special music.

=== Church pipe organ ===
Initially, the church was equipped with a Møller pipe organ, but the instrument was repossessed by the organ builder during the Great Depression. In 1953, a new Reuter organ was installed to take its place. Fifty years later, congregational leaders, led by cantor and organist Ann Burns, began to interview area companies to obtain bids on reconditioning and enhancing the Reuter organ. Berghaus Organ Co. of Bellwood, Illinois, was hired for the job, which was funded by church members' sponsorship of individual pipes from the new ranks. Congregants who thus "bought" a pipe were entitled to take home one of the old pipes removed in the renovation. After six months of renovation, the pipe organ was rededicated on May 23, 2004. The ceremony featured four choirs singing hymns based on the Nicene Creed and highlighting the seasons of the liturgical year; the organ was backed by instrumentalists from the congregation.

=== Expansion ===
Responding to what the pastor called "growing pains", in 1955 the church added an annex to the north side of its 25-year-old structure to provide classroom space for its "Christian education activities." In the groundbreaking ceremony on September 26, 1954, Rev. Setzer used the same shovel he had previously used in 1929 to break ground for the main building. The annex was dedicated with Rev. Dr. A. R. Kretzmann of St. Luke Lutheran Church of Logan Square, Chicago, presiding.

On January 2, 1972, Redeemer celebrated the opening of "Titus Place", across the street from the church, with a furnished kitchen, two classroom areas for meetings or Bible studies, and a commons area for larger gatherings and receptions. The new building also accommodated a main office for the church, a pastor's study, a boardroom and a gymnasium for athletics, fellowship activities, and other gatherings. Land for the new building had been purchased from the Immaculate Conception Roman Catholic parish, and ground was broken in January 1971.

In 1977 a leaded stained-glass window was installed above the chancel; the window had been donated by congregation charter members Dr. & Mrs. Edward Marquardt 25 years earlier, in 1952.

== Pastors ==
Rev. Worth Setzer, a 1923 graduate of Concordia Seminary of St. Louis, Missouri, was installed on October 7, 1928, as Redeemer Lutheran Church's first pastor. Setzer had previously been pastor of St. Stephens Lutheran Church in his hometown of Hickory, North Carolina.

In February 1958 founding pastor Rev. Setzer left Redeemer for the pastorate of First Lutheran Church, Cleveland, Tennessee, and on August 23, 1959, Pittsburgh native Rev. George Bornemann became only the second resident pastor in the church's 30-year history. Previously pastor of St. John's Lutheran Church in Toronto, Bornemann had helped to found Lutheran congregations in Port Credit/Mississauga, North York and Scarborough, Ontario.

Bornemann left Redeemer in the middle of 1976 after being elected president of the English District of the LCMS and was succeeded by Rev. Richard Drews on May 15, 1977.

On March 30, 2003, the congregation installed Rev. Robert Fitzpatrick as pastor. He had been serving this non-geographic district as the president's executive assistant for missions, and he had previously served for 18 years with a suburban Cleveland congregation and for ten years with a small-town Nebraska church.

Next in line, Rev. Scott Stiegemeyer, took on his responsibilities on January 24, 2010, and served until June 7, 2015, after which he took a call to Concordia University Irvine as an Assistant Professor of Theology and Bioethics.

Redeemer's pastoral vacancy was filled by Rev. H. David Brummer. The current pastor, Rev. Anthony Oliphant, was installed on October 11, 2015, by the Rev. Dr. Jamison Hardy, Bishop of the English District. Both Stiegemeyer and Oliphant are more-recent graduates of Concordia Theological Seminary of Fort Wayne, Indiana.

=== Previous ministers ===
Former senior ministers of Redeemer Lutheran Church, with their years of appointment:

- Rev. Worth A. Setzer (1928–1959)
- Rev. George W. Bornemann (1959–1976)
- Richard D. Drews (1977–2002)
- Robert Fitzpatick (2003–2010)
- Scott Stiegemeyer (2010–2015)
- Anthony Oliphant (2015– )
