= St. Michael's Church, Tallinn =

Church building in Tallinn, Estonia

Coordinates: 59°26′05″N 24°44′31″E

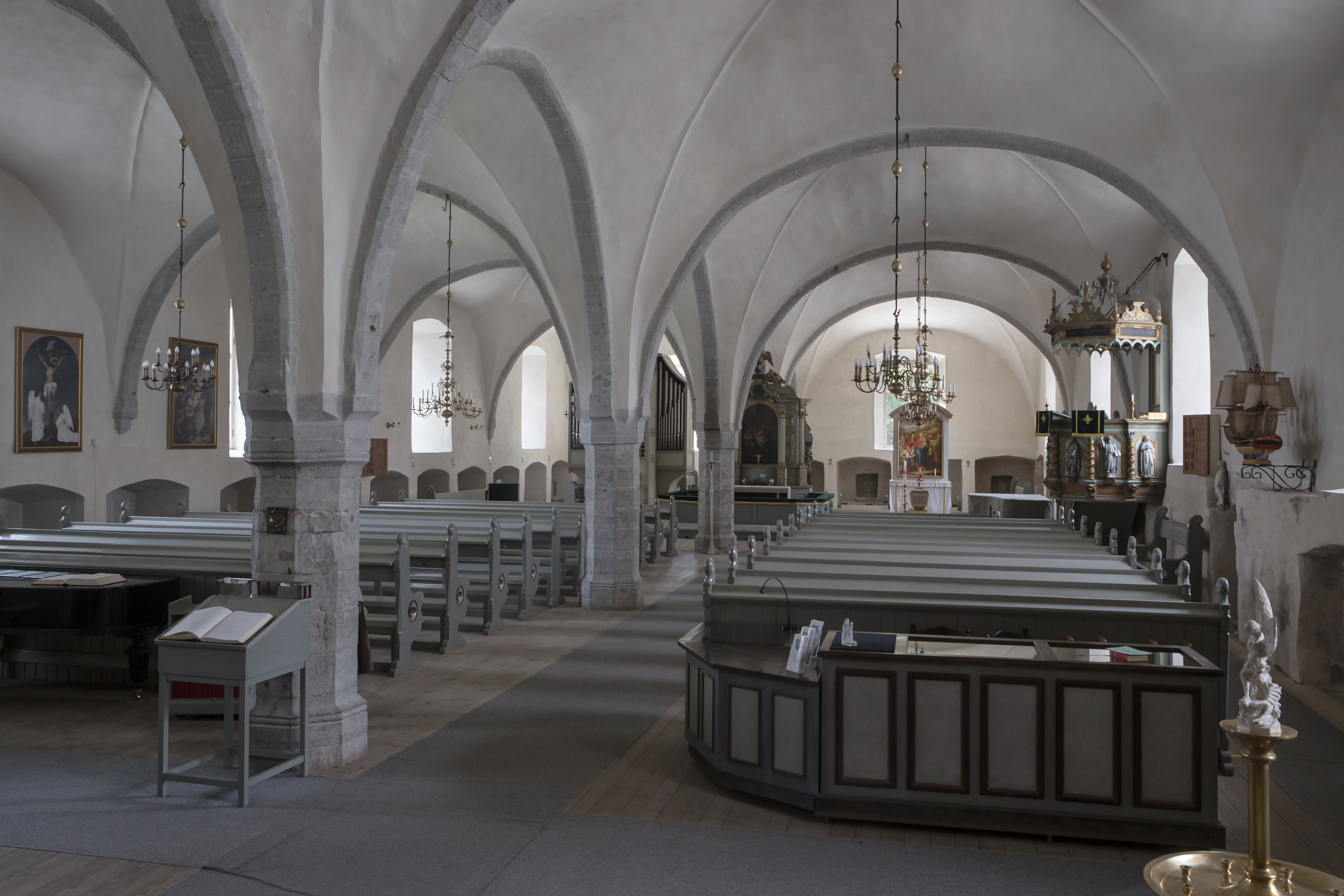
Interior view of St. Michael's Church, Tallinn

St. Michael's Church or St. Michael's Swedish Church (Estonian: Rootsi-Mihkli kirik, Swedish: Svenska S:t Mikaelskyrkan) is a Lutheran church used by the Swedish congregation in the old town district of Tallinn, Estonia.

== History and architecture ==
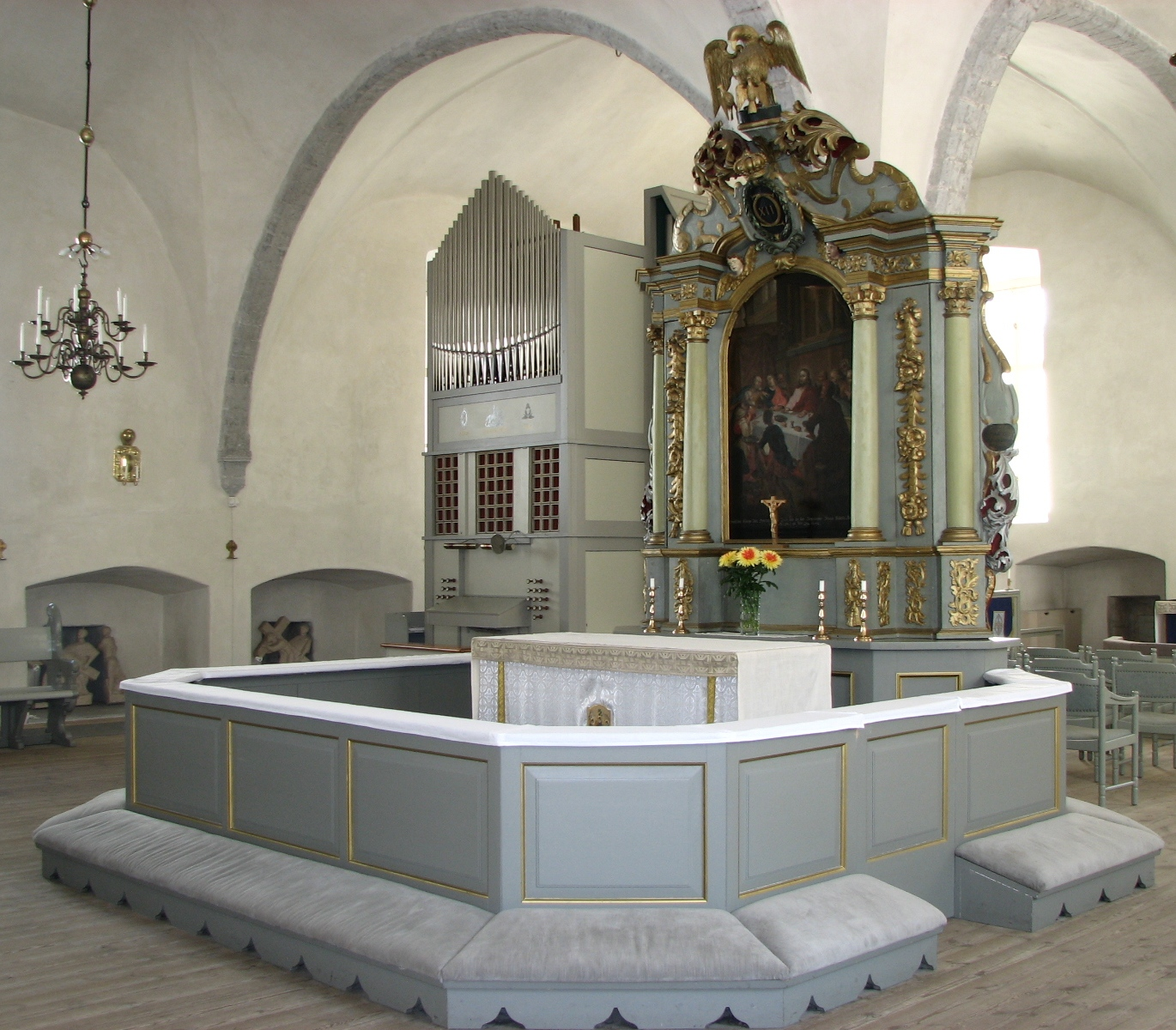
The altar of St. Michael's Church

A Swedish-speaking minority and congregation has probably existed in Tallinn since the Middle Ages, but the first written reference of Swedish congregation dates from 1531. After the Swedish defeat during the Great Northern War and the subsequent loss of the province of Estonia to Russia in 1710, the church of the congregation, at the time housed in the church of the former monastery of St. Michael, was however taken over by the Russian authorities and used as a Russian garrison church. For some years during the early 1700s the congregation was therefore without a church until they relocated to the present premises in 1733.

The building they were granted had been part of a medieval almshouse or hospital complex and the interior of the church is to this day dominated by the heavy medieval vaulting. During the upheavals of World War II and the Soviet occupation of Estonia, most Estonian Swedes fled the country and resettled in Sweden, and the Soviet authorities expropriated the building which was used as a sports club until the restoration of Estonia's independence in 1991. In 1992, following a state visit by the king of Sweden, the building once more passed into the hands of the Estonian-Swedish congregation. The church was reconsecrated after a period of repairs in 2002. Apart from the aforementioned Gothic vaulting, the church is notable for its fine baroque altar (artist Joachim Armbrust) and baptistery (artist Christian Ackermann).
