= Carl Johan Church =

Parish church on Sagberget, Gothenburg

Coordinates: 57°41′46.49″N 11°55′23.16″E

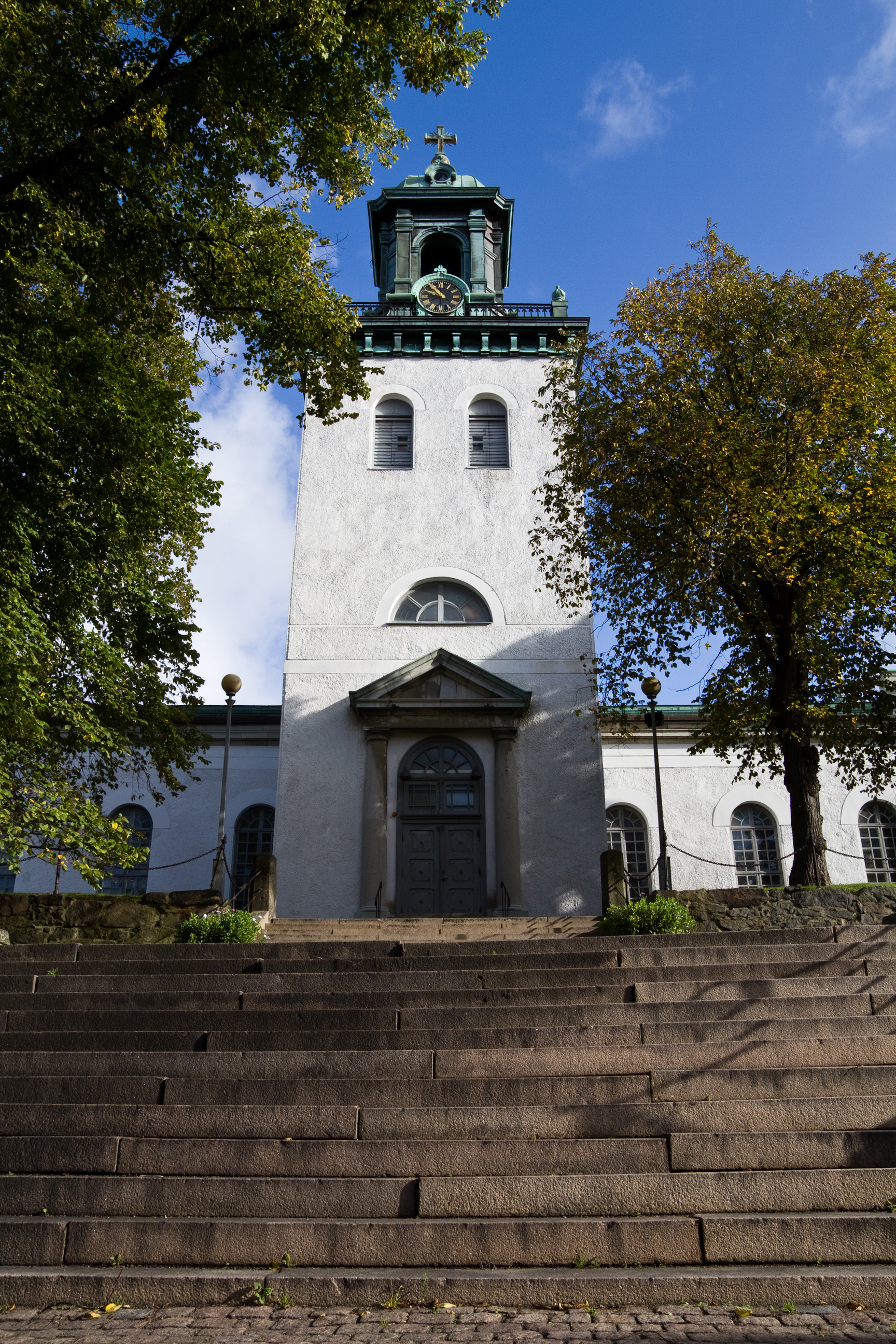
=Carl Johan Church

Carl Johan Church (Swedish: Carl Johans kyrka) is a Church of Sweden parish church on Sagberget, in Gothenburg. The church, designed by Fredrik Blom, is named after King Charles XIV John (Karl XIV Johan), who a few years before the opening ceremony in 1826 was on a visit to the nearby porter brewery at Klippan.

The parish serves Kungsladugård, Nya Varvet, Sandarna and large parts of Majorna.
