= St. Bartholomew's Church, Themar =

Town church of Themar in Thuringia

Coordinates: 50°30′08″N 10°36′52″E

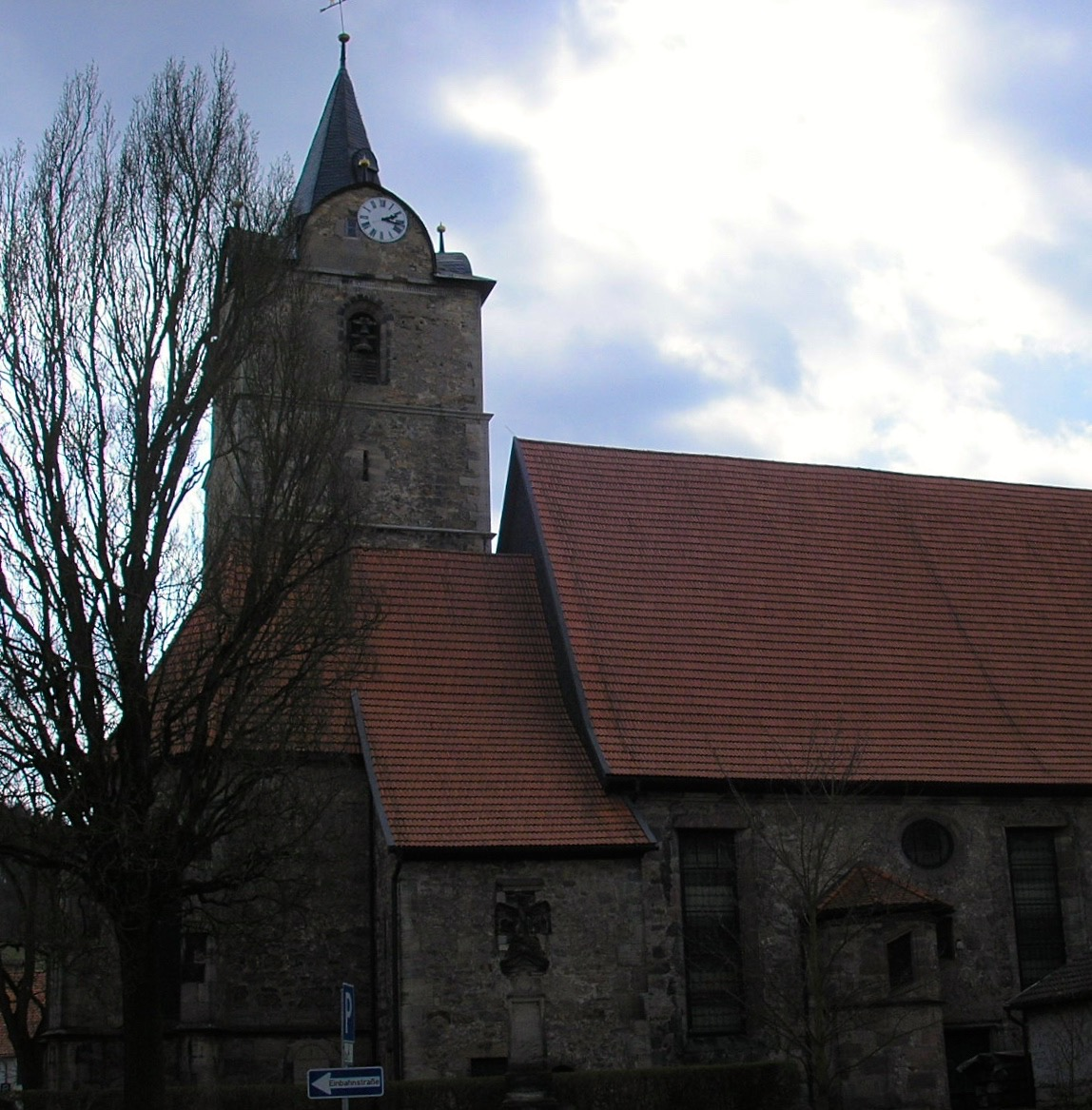
St Bartholomew's Church

The parish church St. Bartholomew's Church is the town church of Themar in Thuringia. It is dedicated to St. Bartholomew. It belongs to the most richly equipped churches of the upper valley of the Werra. It is one of the few buildings of the small town, first mentioned in 796, which outlasted all storms of the time. The Oberkirche (upper church) at the upper gate and the Unterkirche (lower church) at the Werra were the first places of worship in the place. There still exist some remainders of the Romanesque Unterkirche in the vestry and in both lower floors of the church tower.

Pope Sixtus IV gave permission for the restoration of the church on 14 May 1484 with countess Margaretha of Henneberg intermediating.

On 3 May 1488 the Chorherr (canon regular) of the Premonstratensian monastery Veßra and minister of Themar Antonius König founded the building of today's church. In 1502 the hall church in late Gothic style was completed.

The Reformation was introduced to Themar on 5 October 1544 by the count Ernst von Henneberg. After the Protestant Reformation the church received several smaller carved altars from other churches. Since 1541 the church building was frequently converted in the course of the next decades.

The barrel vault and the two matroneums were inserted, whose support beams were decorated with beautiful Bartmannsköpfen (sculptures). Similar sculptures can be found in the churches of Rohr and Herpf near Meiningen.

At the columns, the matroneums were decorated with sculptures of saints and apostles, partially from older Gothic altar works and with famous verses from the bible.

== The Marienaltar ==
In the choir area, there is the valuable Marienaltar (altar of St. Mary), which was created by Hans Nußbaum from Bamberg about 1510.

The altar shows in the center Maria with Jesus as a child, to her sides archangel Michael killing the dragon with his lance, and St. Bartholomew, the patron of church and town.

On the side panels of the altar, there are stations from the life of St. Mary: The announcement to the Virgin Mary, the birth of the Lord, the three Magi and the Lamentation of St Mary by the apostles. At the back of the side panels, there are paintings of St Barbara, St Dorothy, St Margaret, St Catherine. On the Predella of the altar is to be seen the Holy Kinship.

Apart from its artistic value, the Marienaltar has also great importance for local history: It retained the town church in the Thirty Years' War of being burned down. After the defeat of Sweden in the battle of Nördlingen (1634) general Johann Ludwig Hektor of Isolani, "the commander of all Croats", plundered the countries of the Thuringian princes.

At 16 October (Gallustag) in 1634 Themar was burned down (on the same day as Suhl) after the plundering by the Croats. The town church would have been burned as well, but a pious Italian officer gave the order to extinguish the fire when it came near to the Marienaltar.

Further carvings and art treasures are: The shrine of the apostles (about 1500), that is called Nasenaltar (nose altar) because of the expressive faces of the apostles.

At the back of the side panels, there is a painting of the Apostelabschied (Great Commission). At the north wall, there is the altar of pilgrimage one can see the Hühnchenlegende (miracle of the chicken) of Santo Domingo de la Calzada (on the way of St James) at the back of a side panel.

At the south wall there are a Pietà altar and a Gothic Mondsichelmadonna, and in the choir area an epitaph in the Renaissance style. Furthermore, a fresco painting representing St. Catherine, that was detected in 1934, then the richly decorated Schalldeckel (abat-voix, or sounding-board) of the pulpit that dates from 1644 and an Epistelstuhl (reading-desk) likewise from the center of the 17th century and some paintings.

About 1900 stained glass was donated for the windows in the choir area. The pictures show Biblical scenes: the prodigal or lost son, the Kindersegnung (benediction of children, St. Luke 18, 15–17), the Good Samaritan. The last renovation of the St Bartholomew's Church was in 1972.

== The organ ==
Originally the organ of the town church was set up in 1851 at the east wall of the church nave by the organ-builders Johann Michel and Wilhelm Holland (from Schmiedefeld am Rennsteig). Three organ stops of the pedal division were taken over from the Weise-organ built in 1629. In 1866 the organ was moved to the extended second matroneum in the west and renewed and reorganized for the last time in the years 1999/2000 by the company Rösel and Hercher.

From 1668 to 1684 Georg Christoph Bach, the oldest uncle of Johann Sebastian Bach, worked as cantor at the town church and as a teacher at the Latin school of Themar. In 1684 he was appointed to Schweinfurt and became the ancestor of the Schweinfurt branch of the Bach family.

== The tower ==
The church tower in Renaissance style contains three bells. The oldest bell was cast in 1488, another in 1507. The Bartholomäus bell that was cast in 1520 had to be delivered in 1942. In 1955 a steel bell was put in instead. In the church tower there lived a family of tower guards called Rust up to the 1950s. The three rooms of their flat and the winch which helped to wind up food, water and coal up to the flat are to be still seen there.
