= Redeemer Lutheran Church (Victoria, British Columbia) =

Coordinates: 48°26′26″N 123°30′45″W

- Redeemer Lutheran Church
- Redeemer Lutheran Church
- Location: Langford
- Country: Canada
- Denomination: Lutheran Church – Canada
- Website: Redeemer Lutheran Church, Langford, BC, Canada

Redeemer Lutheran Church is the church for the Lutheran parish of Langford, a community on the west shore of Victoria, British Columbia. The parish forms a part of the West Region, (formerly the Alberta-British Columbia district) of Lutheran Church–Canada. The current pastor is Rev. Phillip Washeim, a graduate of Concordia Lutheran Theological Seminary in St. Catharines, Ontario; approximately 40 people usually attend Sunday services.

Together with two other Victoria-area Lutheran churches — Church of the Cross, on Cedar Hill Road in Saanich, and Hope Evangelical Lutheran Church, on Carrick Street in Victoria — Redeemer Church participates in refugee relief and missionary efforts abroad. For example, in 2013, through Canadian Lutheran World Relief, the three churches helped collect warm clothing for Syrian refugees at Jordan's Za’atari refugee camp. Also in conjunction with the other local Lutheran churches, Redeemer Church helps to sponsor a missionary family in Mozambique engaged in Bible translation and church organization in Chichewa, a Bantu language also spoken in Malawi and Zambia.

Rev. Washeim is a named defendant in insolvency proceedings launched by multiple plaintiffs over a Valleyview, Alberta seniors home.

== Brief history ==
=== Early Years at Anglican Church ===
Led by Rev. C. Janzow, then pastor of Victoria's Hope Evangelical Lutheran Church, the Langford-Sidney Lutheran group held their first service on March 18, 1956. For the first three years, the group met two Sunday afternoons a month in facilities shared with them by St. Matthias Anglican Church in Langford.

In September 1957 the group formally organized under the name "Belmont Lutheran Church"; nine adult congregants ratified its constitution. On September 7, 1958, Rev. Janzow ordained Henry F. Behling, from Petoskey, Michigan, and a graduate of Concordia Seminary in Springfield, Illinois, as Belmont's first pastor. From 1958 till the end of 1964, when he left for a pastorate in Lakefield, Minnesota, Rev. Behling conducted weekly Sunday services.

=== Parish hall and church sanctuary ===
In December 1958, with the help of a church extension loan, the congregation acquired 2 hectares (5 acres) of land at the corner of Jacklin and Jenkins roads, across from Belmont Secondary School and the current Westshore Town Centre in Langford. Having hired an architectural firm for the design, the congregation held a ground-breaking ceremony on September 6, 1959, and construction began on a parish hall. The hall was sufficiently complete by December 24 of that same year that the congregation, now called Redeemer Lutheran Church, could hold a Christmas Eve service in the building. The completed parish hall was dedicated on March 15, 1960.

By 1963, the parish hall was deemed to be no longer adequate. The congregation decided that, adjacent to the parish hall, they would need to build the church proper. Ground was broken on November 24, 1963, and the building was dedicated on May 10, 1964. With a declining congregation membership, the church met some of its needs for operating funds by gradually selling off portions of the original 2 hectares for residential building lots; by 2010, the church-owned property was reduced to 0.6 hectares (1.5 acres).

=== Church demolition and temporary location ===
Redeemer Lutheran agreed to sell its remaining property at Jacklin and Jenkins roads to the Hayworth Living Group to construct a six-storey, 158-unit assisted living retirement home. That company then agreed to deed back a strata lot to an eventual two-storey church facility which they would build for the church within the envelope of the new $26-million building within an anticipated 18-month construction period. On January 15, 2012, Redeemer Lutheran held a deconsecration service in the 1964 building, in the expectation that it would be demolished during the spring of that year. Demolition, however, did not begin until four years later. Phil Washeim, the pastor, said the old building had long passed its best-before date and had been in need of ongoing costly repairs, including the need for a new roof. “It made more sense to plan for a new building,” Washeim said. Congregation members held a solemn ceremony on February 29, 2016, to bless the site and break ground for the new church. At the time of the groundbreaking, the pastor had expected work to be completed within 18 months, although it in fact took 27 months.

During the more than five years before the new building received its occupancy permit, the church congregation met on the fourth floor of the Alexander Mackie Lodge at 753 Station Avenue in Langford. The church placed its altar in storage, to be reinstalled in the new building when construction was eventually completed.

=== New premises ===
In May 2018 the new building for Redeemer Lutheran church was officially opened. The opening service and dedication of the building included Lutheran Church–Canada's president, Timothy Teuscher, and many pastors and lay people from Vancouver Island parishes.

The new building includes an elevator to facilitate access. The seniors residence has 39 market-based condos and 130 rental units for independent living with some available in-house amenities — including a coffeehouse, fitness facility, hair salon, aesthetics area, an open courtyard and scooter parking — as well as being located close to shopping and recreation.

According to Micky Fleming, president of Cherish Community Living, the overall builder and operator of the airspace parcel building that includes Redeemer Church, residents will be able to move from owned space to a rental unit if their health deteriorates or they lose mobility, and Cherish "will facilitate home support for residents who need more care" — for example, through the nearby Mackie Lodge for Beacon Community Services staff or for home health care visits.

With the project completion, Howard Blair, president of Redeemer Lutheran and chair of the building committee, said he expected weekly church attendance to increase. “A strong group of people had a goal, and it has been a great journey,” Blair said. “It’s an exciting time for our congregation.

== Shepherd’s Village liquidation proceedings ==
Plaintiffs Sharon Sherman, the estate of Ruby Sherman, Georg Beinert, Wiley Hertlein and Glen Mitchell have sued Redeemer pastor Phillip Washeim — together with retired Redeemer pastor Mark Beiderwieden and 50 other individuals, as well as 11 corporate entities — in insolvency class actions launched in both the Court of King's Bench of Alberta (Cases 1501-00955 and 1603-03142) and in the Supreme Court of British Columbia (Case S1611798), over church members having invested in a project to build Shepherd’s Village, 48 units of Church-owned retirement housing in Valleyview, Alberta, for which the residents have life leases and which Shepherd’s Village Ministries, the management company is unable to meet its liabilities and repair obligations. A pseudonymous Lutheran blogger, who characterizes herself as “a neutral observer,” has published an analysis of the Shepherd's Village liquidation proceedings that implies financial mismanagement and states that the limited company could not even meet its most basic requirement of electing a board of directors.

== Clergy ==
Several pastors and vicars have served at Redeemer Lutheran over the years:

- 1958–1964: Henry Behling
- 1965 : C. Janzow/Les Carlson
- 1965–1966: Don Just
- 1967–1972: Fred Otke
- 1972–1973: Don Koch
- 1973–1985: Herman Bickel
- 1985–1987: Fred Otke/Robert Willie
- 1987–1991: Charles Coole
- 1991–1992 Jeff Muchow/David Carnahan
- 1992–1997: Larry Gajdos
- 1997–1999: David Carnahan
- 1999–2000: Mark Beiderwieden/Mark Dressler
- 2000–2001: Mark Beiderwieden/Matt Ziprick
- 2001–2002: Mark Beiderwieden/Alex Klages
- 2002– : Phillip Washeim
