= 2023 NHL entry draft =

2023 North American ice hockey draft

General information
- Date: June 28–29, 2023
- Location: Bridgestone Arena; Nashville, Tennessee, U.S.
- Networks: Sportsnet, TVA Sports (Canada); ESPN, NHL Network (United States)

Overview
- 224 total selections in 7 rounds
- First selection: (Canada) Connor Bedard (Chicago Blackhawks)

The 2023 NHL entry draft was the 61st draft for the National Hockey League. The draft was held on June 28–29, 2023, at Bridgestone Arena in Nashville, Tennessee.

The first three selections were Connor Bedard by the Chicago Blackhawks, Leo Carlsson by the Anaheim Ducks, and Adam Fantilli by the Columbus Blue Jackets.

== Eligibility ==
Ice hockey players born between January 1, 2003, and September 15, 2005, are eligible for selection in the 2023 NHL entry draft. Additionally, un-drafted, non-North American players born in 2002 are eligible for the draft; and those players who were drafted in the 2021 NHL entry draft, but not signed by an NHL team and who were born after June 30, 2003, are also eligible to re-enter the draft.

== Draft lottery ==
External videos
- Gary Bettman conducts the 2023 NHL Draft Lottery, NHL's official YouTube channel. May 8, 2023.

Beginning with the 2014–15 NHL season the NHL changed the weighting system that was used in previous years. Under the new system the odds of winning the draft lottery for the four lowest finishing teams in the league decreased, while the odds for the other non-playoff teams increased. As the league reduced the number of lottery drawings before the 2021–22 season, this resulted in two lotteries being held instead of three. Since the 2022 draft lottery, the teams winning one of the two drawings are allowed to move up a maximum of ten spots in the draft order and a team is only allowed to win the lottery twice in a five-year period.

The Chicago Blackhawks and Anaheim Ducks won the two draft lotteries that took place on May 8, 2023, giving them the first and second picks overall. Chicago moved up two spots to receive the first pick, while Anaheim and Columbus each moved down one spot. During the broadcast ESPN analyst Kevin Weekes revealed that the Columbus Blue Jackets had received the third overall pick before the top three picks were officially revealed, which was attributed to a teleprompter mistake.

Indicates team won first overall
Indicates team won second overall
Indicates teams that did not win a lottery

Complete draft position odds
Team	1st	2nd	3rd	4th	5th	6th	7th	8th	9th	10th	11th	12th	13th	14th	15th	16th
Anaheim	25.5%	18.8%	55.7%													
Columbus	13.5%	14.1%	30.7%	41.7%												
Chicago	11.5%	11.2%	7.8%	39.7%	29.8%											
San Jose	9.5%	9.5%	0.3%	15.4%	44.6%	20.8%										
Montreal	8.5%	8.6%	0.3%		24.5%	44.0%	14.2%									
Arizona	7.5%	7.7%	0.2%			34.1%	41.4%	9.1%								
Philadelphia	6.5%	6.7%	0.2%				44.4%	36.5%	5.6%							
Washington	6.0%	6.2%	0.2%					54.4%	30.0%	3.2%						
Detroit	5.0%	5.2%	0.2%						64.4%	23.5%	1.7%					
St. Louis	3.5%	3.7%	0.1%							73.3%	18.4%	0.9%				
Vancouver	3.0%	3.2%	0.1%								79.9%	13.4%	0.5%			
Ottawa		5.3%										85.7%	8.9%	0.2%		
Buffalo			4.3%										90.7%	5.1%	>0.0%	
Pittsburgh				3.1%										94.7%	2.1%	>0.0%
Nashville					1.1%										97.9%	1.1%
Calgary						1.0%										98.9%

== Top prospects ==
Source: NHL Central Scouting (April 18, 2023) ranking.

Ranking	North American skaters	European skaters
1	(Canada) Connor Bedard (C)	(Sweden) Leo Carlsson (C)
2	(Canada) Adam Fantilli (C)	(Russia) Matvei Michkov (RW)
3	(United States) Will Smith (C)	(Slovakia) Dalibor Dvorsky (C)
4	(Canada) Matthew Wood (RW)	(Czech Republic) Eduard Sale (LW)
5	(United States) Ryan Leonard (RW)	(Austria) David Reinbacher (D)
6	(Canada) Zach Benson (LW)	(Sweden) Otto Stenberg (C)
7	(Canada) Nate Danielson (C)	(Sweden) Axel Sandin-Pellikka (D)
8	(United States) Oliver Moore (C)	(Finland) Lenni Hameenaho (RW)
9	(Slovakia) Samuel Honzek (LW)	(Russia) Daniil But (LW)
10	(United States) Gabe Perreault (RW)	(Russia) Mikhail Gulyayev (D)

Ranking	North American goalies	European goalies
1	(Canada) Carson Bjarnason	(Sweden) Alexander Hellnemo
2	(Czech Republic) Michael Hrabal	(Finland) Juha Jatkola
3	(United States) Trey Augustine	(Sweden) Ian Blomquist

== Selections by round ==
The order of the 2023 entry draft is listed below.

=== Round one ===
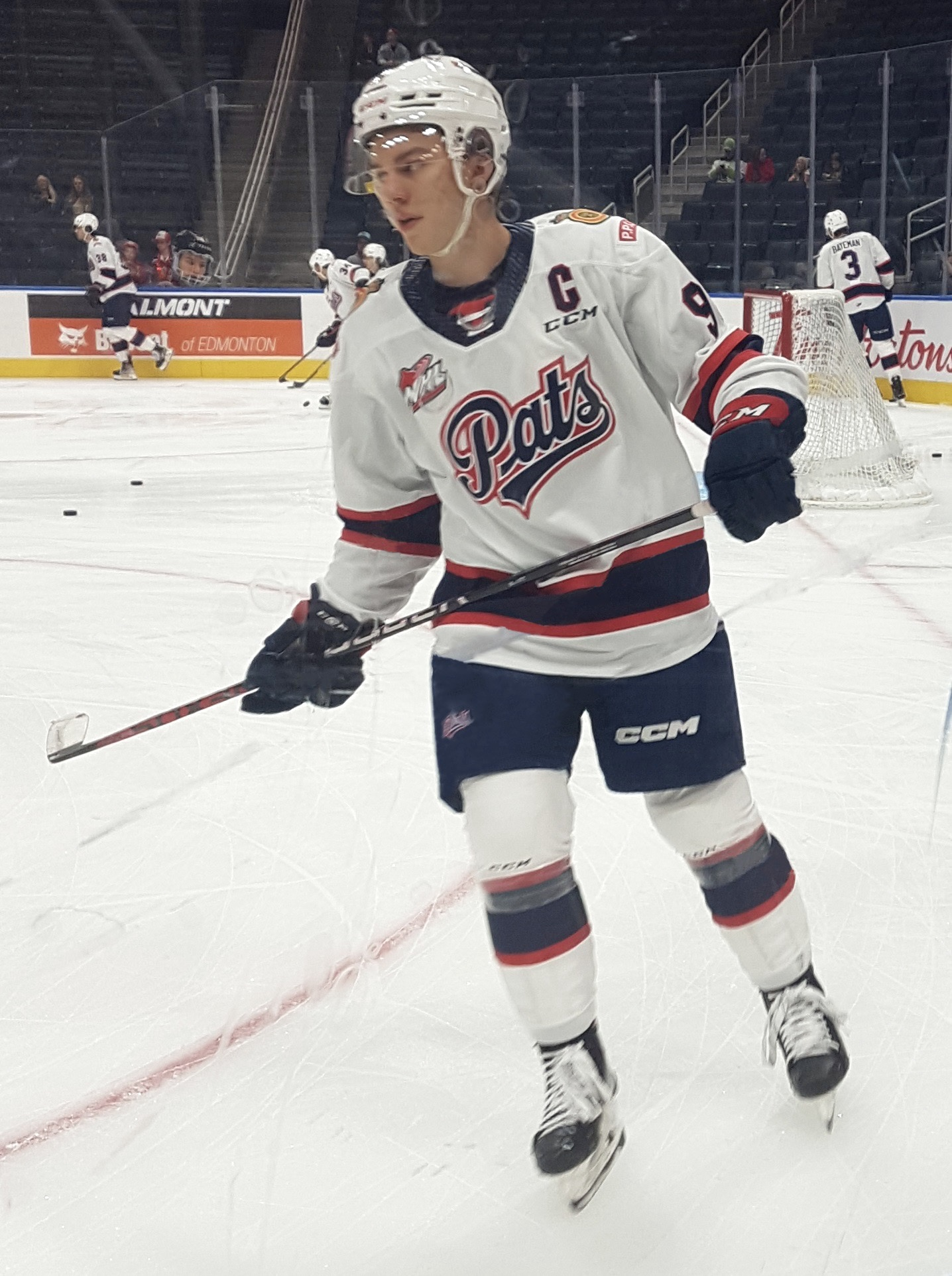
Connor Bedard was selected first overall by the Chicago Blackhawks.

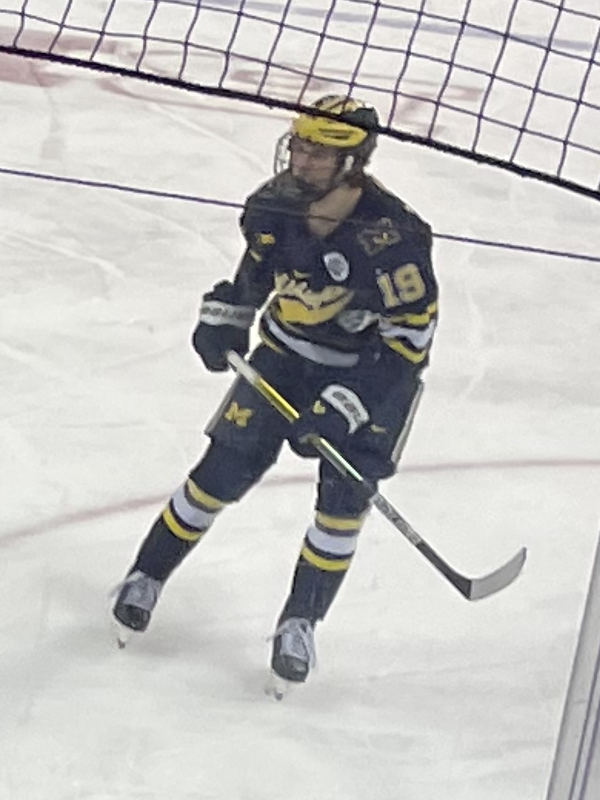
Adam Fantilli was selected third overall by the Columbus Blue Jackets

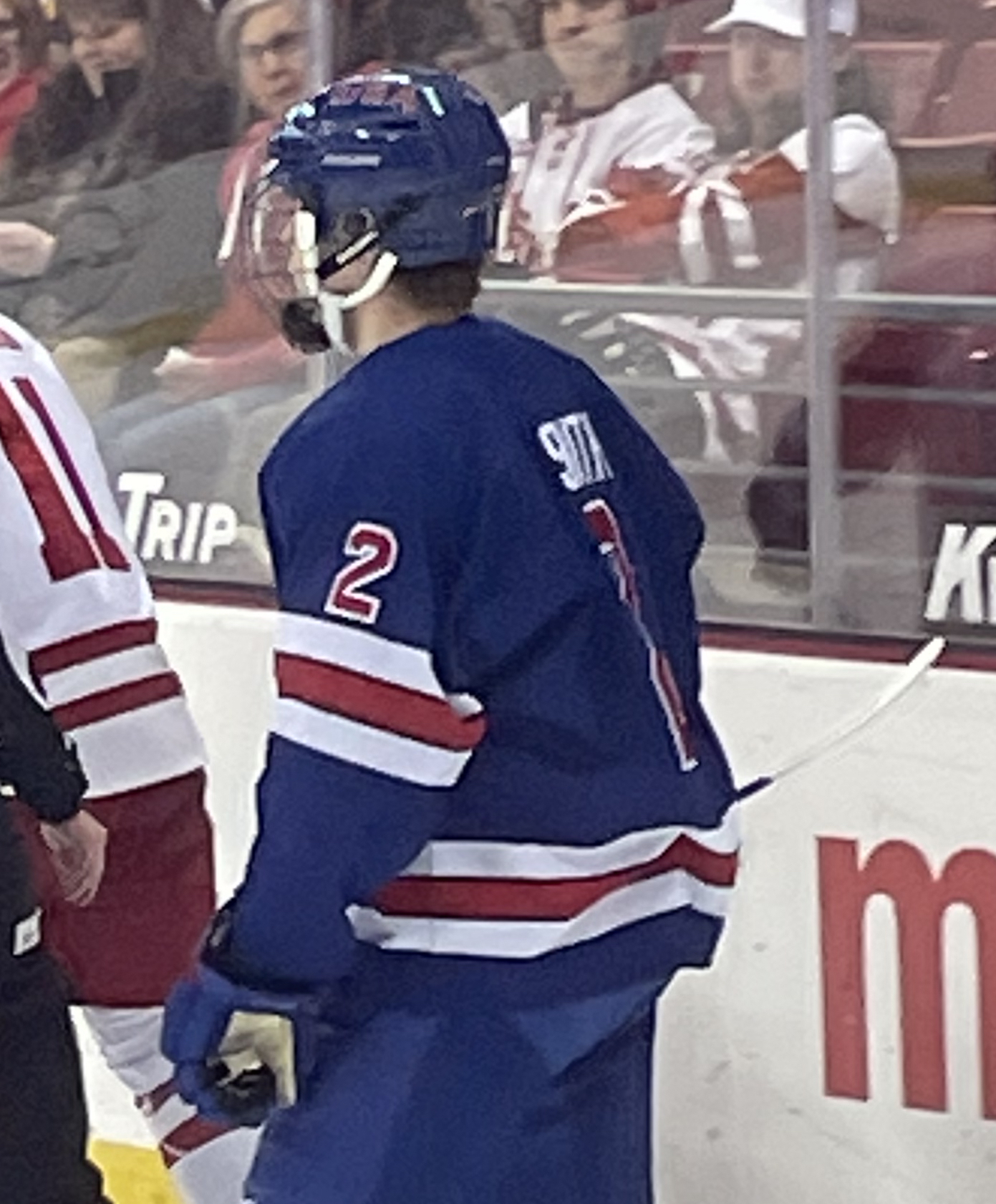
Will Smith was selected fourth overall by the San Jose Sharks

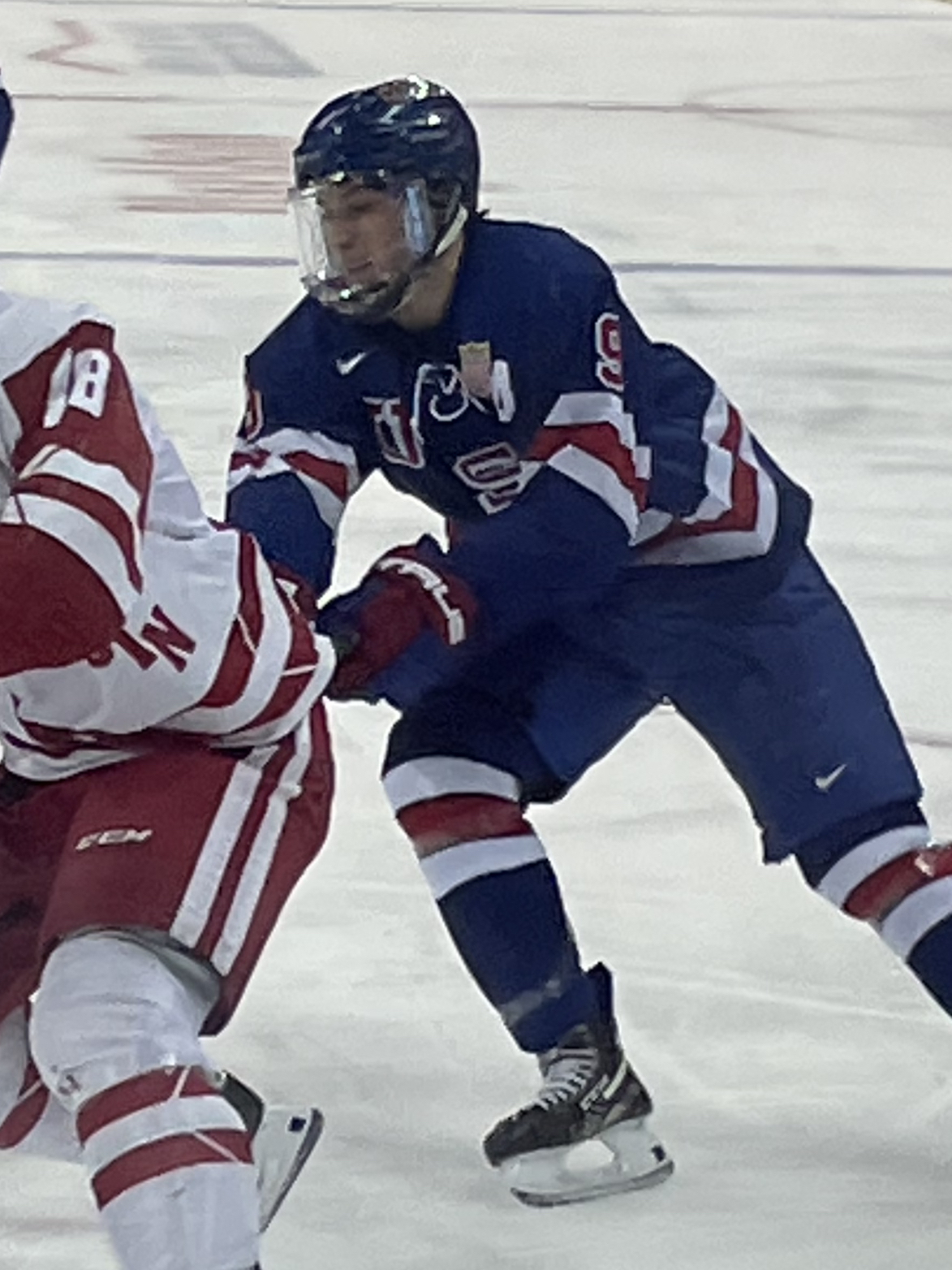
Ryan Leonard was selected eighth overall by the Washington Capitals

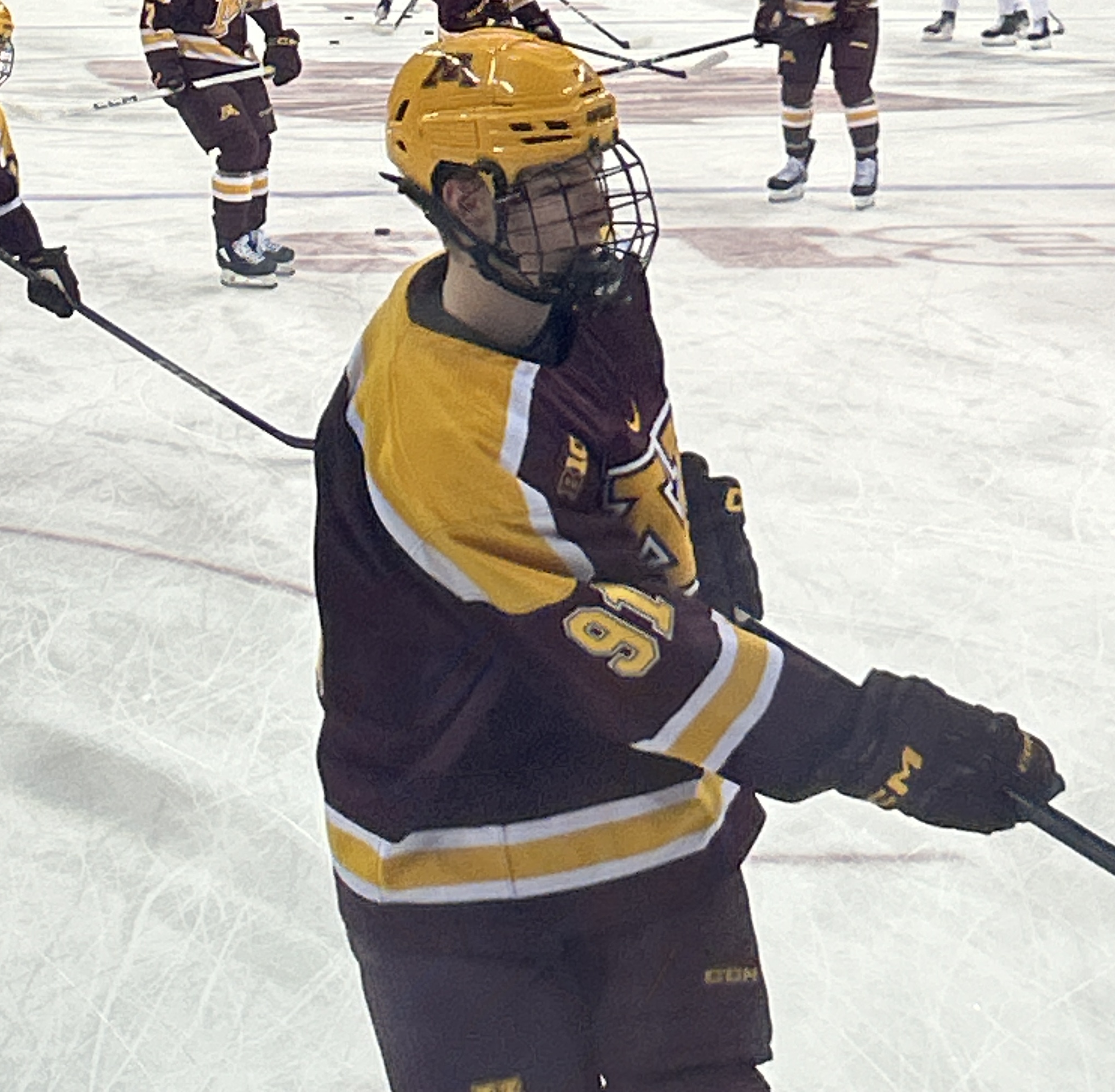
Matthew Wood was selected 15th overall by the Nashville Predators.

Oliver Moore was selected 18th overall by the Chicago Blackhawks.

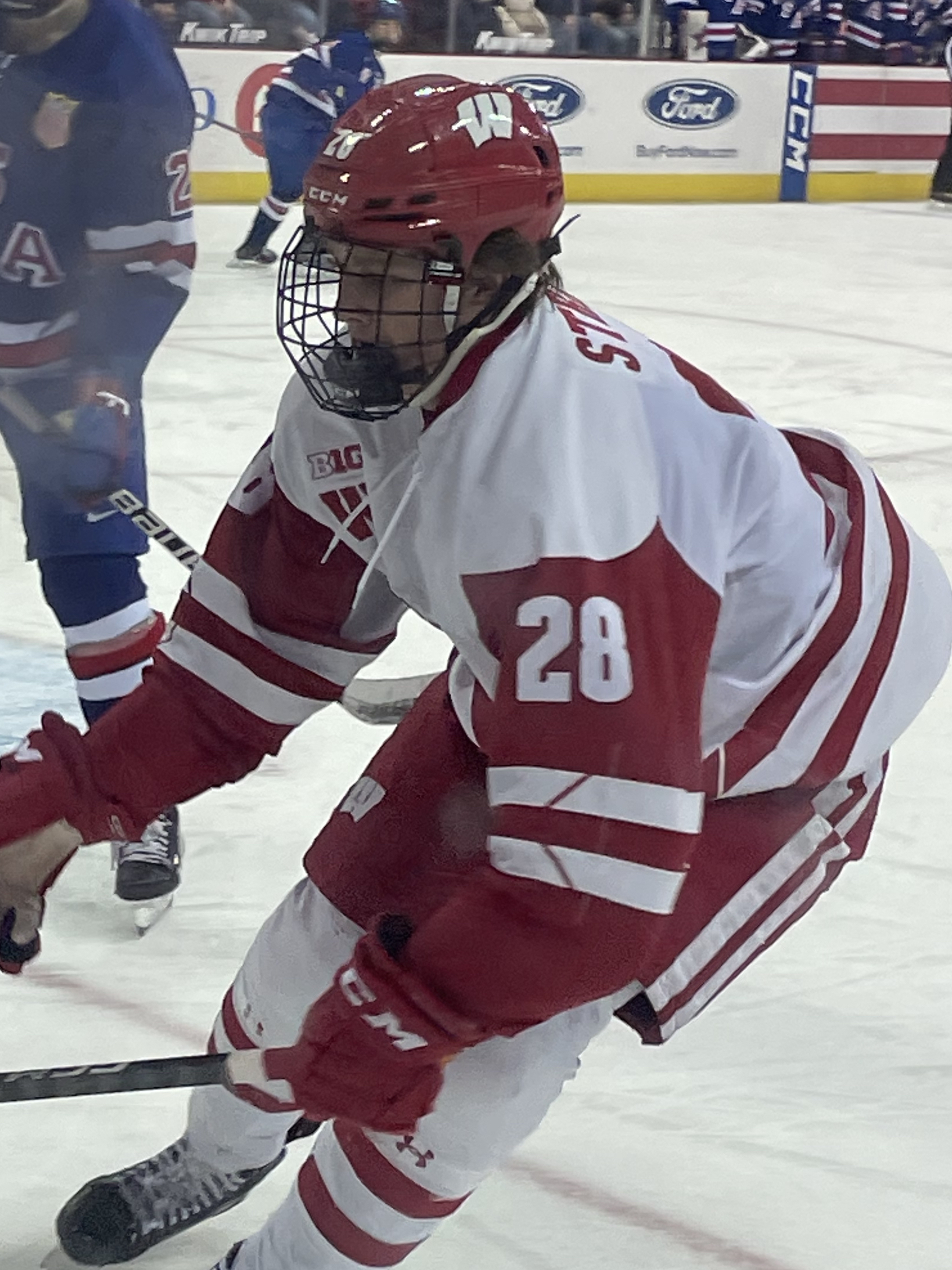
Charlie Stramel was selected 21st overall by the Minnesota Wild.

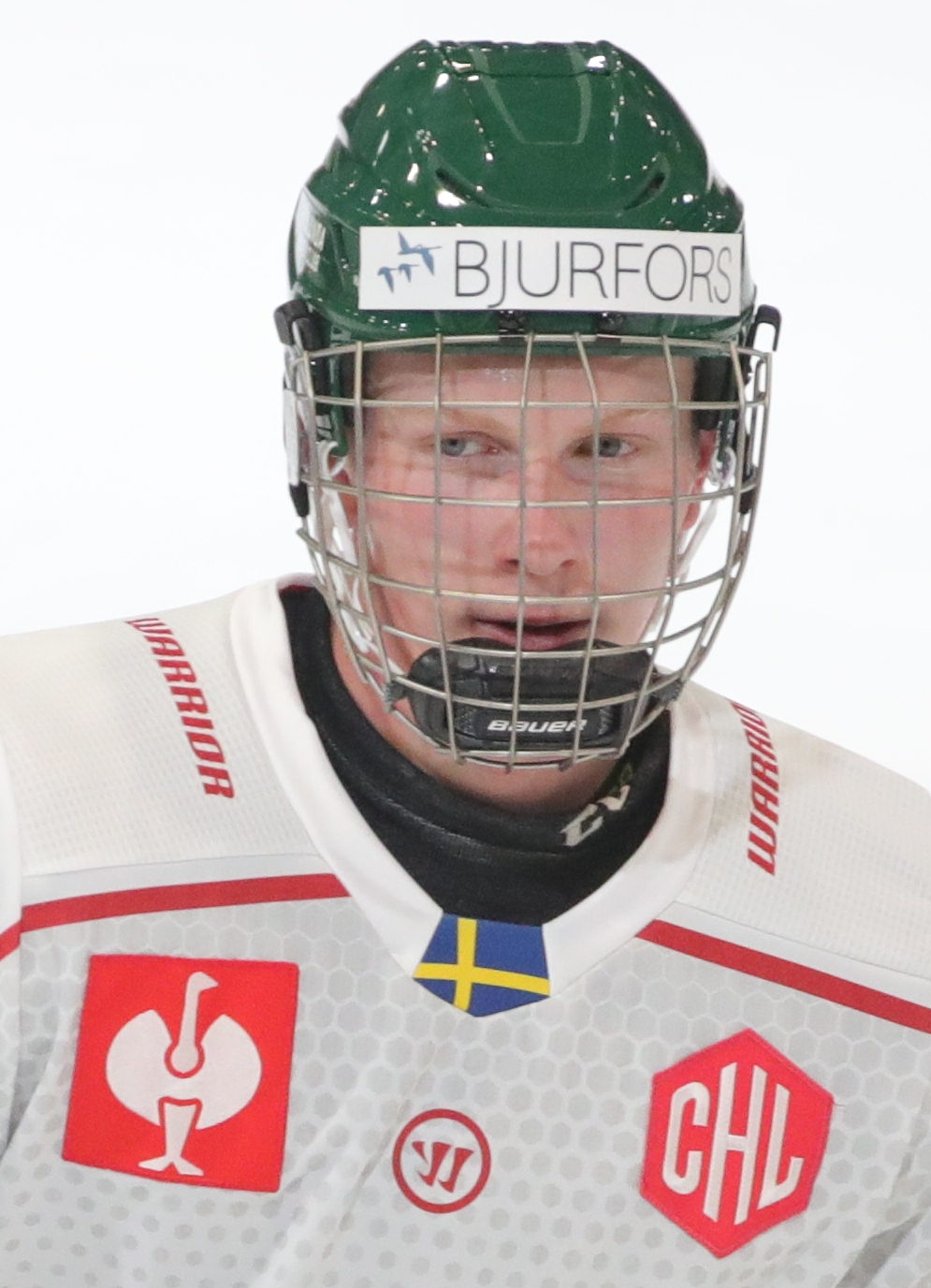
Otto Stenberg was selected 25th overall by the St. Louis Blues.

= NHL All-Star team ·	= NHL All-Star (Note: Players are identified as an All-Star if they were selected for the All-Star game at any time in their career.) ·	= NHL All-Star and NHL All-Star team ·

#	Player	Nationality	NHL team	College/junior/club team
1	Connor Bedard (C)	Canada	Chicago Blackhawks	Regina Pats (WHL)
2	Leo Carlsson (C)	Sweden	Anaheim Ducks	Orebro HK (SHL)
3	Adam Fantilli (C)	Canada	Columbus Blue Jackets	Michigan Wolverines (Big Ten)
4	Will Smith (C)	United States	San Jose Sharks	U.S. NTDP (USHL)
5	David Reinbacher (D)	Austria	Montreal Canadiens	EHC Kloten (National League)
6	Dmitriy Simashev (D)	Russia	Arizona Coyotes	Loko Yaroslavl (MHL)
7	Matvei Michkov (RW)	Russia	Philadelphia Flyers	SKA Saint Petersburg (KHL)
8	Ryan Leonard (RW)	United States	Washington Capitals	U.S. NTDP (USHL)
9	Nate Danielson (C)	Canada	Detroit Red Wings	Brandon Wheat Kings (WHL)
10	Dalibor Dvorsky (C)	Slovakia	St. Louis Blues	AIK IF (HockeyAllsvenskan)
11	Tom Willander (D)	Sweden	Vancouver Canucks	Rogle BK (J20 Nationell)
12	Daniil But (LW)	Russia	Arizona Coyotes (from Ottawa)^{1}	Lokomotiv Yaroslavl (KHL)
13	Zach Benson (LW)	Canada	Buffalo Sabres	Winnipeg Ice (WHL)
14	Brayden Yager (C)	Canada	Pittsburgh Penguins	Moose Jaw Warriors (WHL)
15	Matthew Wood (LW)	Canada	Nashville Predators	UConn Huskies (Hockey East)
16	Samuel Honzek (LW)	Slovakia	Calgary Flames	Vancouver Giants (WHL)
17	Axel Sandin-Pellikka (D)	Sweden	Detroit Red Wings (from NY Islanders via Vancouver)^{2}	Skelleftea AIK (SHL)
18	Colby Barlow (LW)	Canada	Winnipeg Jets	Owen Sound Attack (OHL)
19	Oliver Moore (C)	United States	Chicago Blackhawks (from Tampa Bay)^{3}	U.S. NTDP (USHL)
20	Eduard Sale (LW)	Czech Republic	Seattle Kraken	HC Kometa Brno (Czech Extraliga)
21	Charlie Stramel (C)	United States	Minnesota Wild	Wisconsin Badgers (Big Ten)
22	Oliver Bonk (D)	Canada	Philadelphia Flyers (from Los Angeles via Columbus)^{4}	London Knights (OHL)
23	Gabe Perreault (RW)	United States	New York Rangers	U.S. NTDP (USHL)
24	Tanner Molendyk (D)	Canada	Nashville Predators (from Edmonton)^{5}	Saskatoon Blades (WHL)
25	Otto Stenberg (C)	Sweden	St. Louis Blues (from Toronto)^{6}	Frolunda HC (SHL)
26	Quentin Musty (LW)	United States	San Jose Sharks (from New Jersey)^{7}	Sudbury Wolves (OHL)
27	Calum Ritchie (C)	Canada	Colorado Avalanche	Oshawa Generals (OHL)
28	Easton Cowan (RW)	Canada	Toronto Maple Leafs (from Boston via Washington)^{8}	London Knights (OHL)
29	Theo Lindstein (D)	Sweden	St. Louis Blues (from Dallas via NY Rangers)^{9}	Brynas IF (SHL)
30	Bradly Nadeau (LW)	Canada	Carolina Hurricanes	Penticton Vees (BCHL)
31	Mikhail Gulyayev (D)	Russia	Colorado Avalanche (from Florida via Montreal)^{10}	Avangard Omsk (KHL)
32	David Edstrom (C)	Sweden	Vegas Golden Knights	Frolunda HC (J20 Nationell)

Notes

1. The Ottawa Senators' first-round pick went to the Arizona Coyotes as the result of a trade on March 1, 2023, that sent Jakob Chychrun to Ottawa in exchange for Washington's conditional second-round pick in 2024, a second-round pick in 2026 and this pick (being conditional at the time of the trade). The condition – Arizona will receive a first-round pick in 2023 if Ottawa's first-round pick in 2023 is outside of the top five selections – was converted when Ottawa did not win either draw in the 2023 NHL Draft Lottery on May 8, 2023.
2. The New York Islanders' first-round pick went to the Detroit Red Wings as the result of a trade on March 1, 2023, that sent Filip Hronek and a fourth-round pick in 2023 to Vancouver in exchange for a second-round pick in 2023 and this pick (being conditional at the time of the trade). The condition – Detroit will receive the Islanders' first-round pick in 2023 if the Islanders' first-round pick in 2023 is outside of the top twelve selections – was converted when the Islanders qualified for the 2023 Stanley Cup playoffs on April 12, 2023.
  Vancouver previously acquired this pick in a trade on January 30, 2023, that sent Bo Horvat to New York in exchange for Anthony Beauvillier, Aatu Raty and this conditional pick.
3. The Tampa Bay Lightning's first-round pick went to the Chicago Blackhawks as the result of a trade on March 18, 2022, that sent Brandon Hagel and a fourth-round pick in 2022 and 2024 to Tampa Bay in exchange for Boris Katchouk, Taylor Raddysh, a conditional first-round pick in 2024 and this pick (being conditional at the time of the trade). The condition – Chicago will receive a first-round pick in 2023 if Tampa Bay's first-round pick in 2023 is outside of the top ten selections – was converted when the Lightning qualified for the 2023 Stanley Cup playoffs on April 1, 2023.
4. The Los Angeles Kings' first-round pick went to the Philadelphia Flyers as the result of a trade on June 6, 2023, that sent Ivan Provorov and Kevin Connauton to Columbus in exchange for a conditional second-round pick in 2024 or 2025 and this pick.
  Columbus previously acquired this pick as the result of a trade on March 1, 2023, that sent Joonas Korpisalo and Vladislav Gavrikov to Los Angeles in exchange for Jonathan Quick, a third-round pick in 2024 and this pick (being conditional at the time of the trade). The condition – Columbus will receive a first-round pick in 2023 if the Kings qualify for the 2023 Stanley Cup playoffs – was converted when the Kings qualified for the 2023 Stanley Cup playoffs on April 2, 2023.
5. The Edmonton Oilers' first-round pick went to the Nashville Predators as the result of a trade on February 28, 2023, that sent Mattias Ekholm and a sixth-round pick in 2024 to Edmonton in exchange for Tyson Barrie, Reid Schaefer, a fourth-round pick in 2024 and this pick.
6. The Toronto Maple Leafs' first-round pick went to the St. Louis Blues as the result of a trade on February 17, 2023, that sent Noel Acciari and Josh Pillar to Toronto in exchange for Adam Gaudette, Mikhail Abramov, Ottawa's third-round pick in 2023, a second-round pick in 2024 and this pick.
7. The New Jersey Devils first-round pick went to the San Jose Sharks as a result of the trade on February 26, 2023, that sent Timo Meier, Timur Ibragimov, Scott Harrington, Santeri Hatakka, Zachary Emond and Colorado's fifth-round pick in 2024 to New Jersey in exchange for Shakir Mukhamadullin, Nikita Okhotiuk, Andreas Johnsson, Fabian Zetterlund, a conditional second-round pick in 2024, a seventh-round pick in 2024 and this pick (being conditional at the time of the trade). The condition – San Jose will receive a first-round pick in 2023 if New Jersey's first-round pick in 2023 is outside of the top two selections – was converted when the Devils qualified for the 2023 Stanley Cup playoffs on March 25, 2023.
8. The Boston Bruins' first-round pick went to the Toronto Maple Leafs as the result of a trade on February 28, 2023, that sent Rasmus Sandin to Washington in exchange for Erik Gustafsson and this pick.
  Washington previously acquired this pick as the result of a trade on February 23, 2023, that sent Garnet Hathaway and Dmitry Orlov to Boston in exchange for Craig Smith, a third-round pick in 2024, a second-round pick in 2025 and this pick.
9. The Dallas Stars' first-round pick went to the St. Louis Blues as the result of a trade on February 9, 2023, that sent Vladimir Tarasenko and Niko Mikkola to New York in exchange for Sammy Blais, Hunter Skinner, a conditional fourth-round pick in 2024 and this pick (being conditional at the time of the trade). The condition – St. Louis will receive the later of the Rangers' or Stars' first-round picks in 2023 – was converted when the Rangers were eliminated from the 2023 Stanley Cup playoffs ensuring that the Stars' first-round pick would be lower on May 1, 2023.
  The Rangers previously acquired this pick as the result of a trade on September 19, 2022, that sent Nils Lundkvist to Dallas in exchange for a conditional fourth-round pick in 2025 and this pick (being conditional at the time of the trade). The condition – New York will receive a first-round pick in 2023 if the Stars' first-round pick in 2023 is outside of the top ten selections – was converted when the Stars qualified for the 2023 Stanley Cup playoffs on April 3, 2023.
10. The Florida Panthers' first-round pick went to the Colorado Avalanche as the result of a trade on June 27, 2023, that sent Alex Newhook to Montreal in exchange for Gianni Fairbrother, a second-round pick in 2023 and this pick.
  Montreal previously acquired this pick as the result of a trade on March 16, 2022, that sent Ben Chiarot to Florida in exchange for Ty Smilanic, a conditional fourth-round pick in 2022 and this pick (being conditional at the time of the trade). The condition – Montreal will receive a first-round pick in 2023 if Florida's first-round pick in 2022 is outside of the top ten selections – was converted when the Panthers qualified for the 2022 Stanley Cup playoffs on April 3, 2022.

=== Round two ===
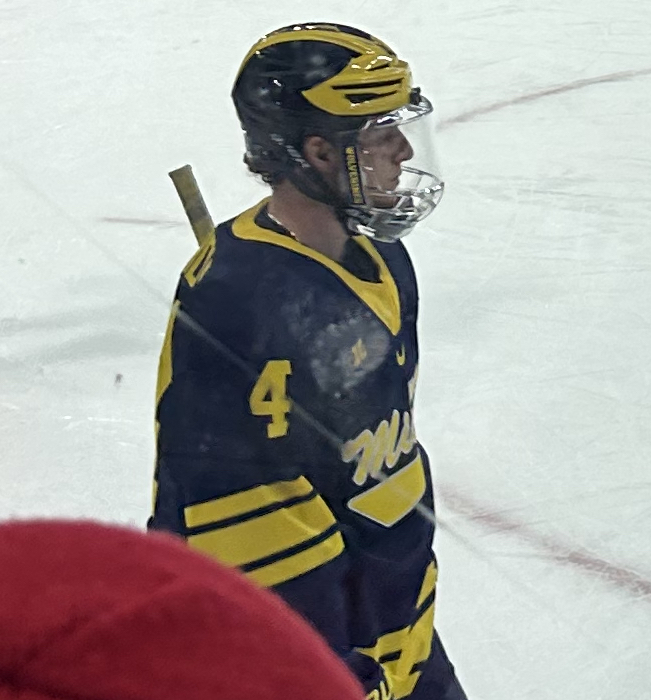
Gavin Brindley was selected 34th overall by the Columbus Blue Jackets.

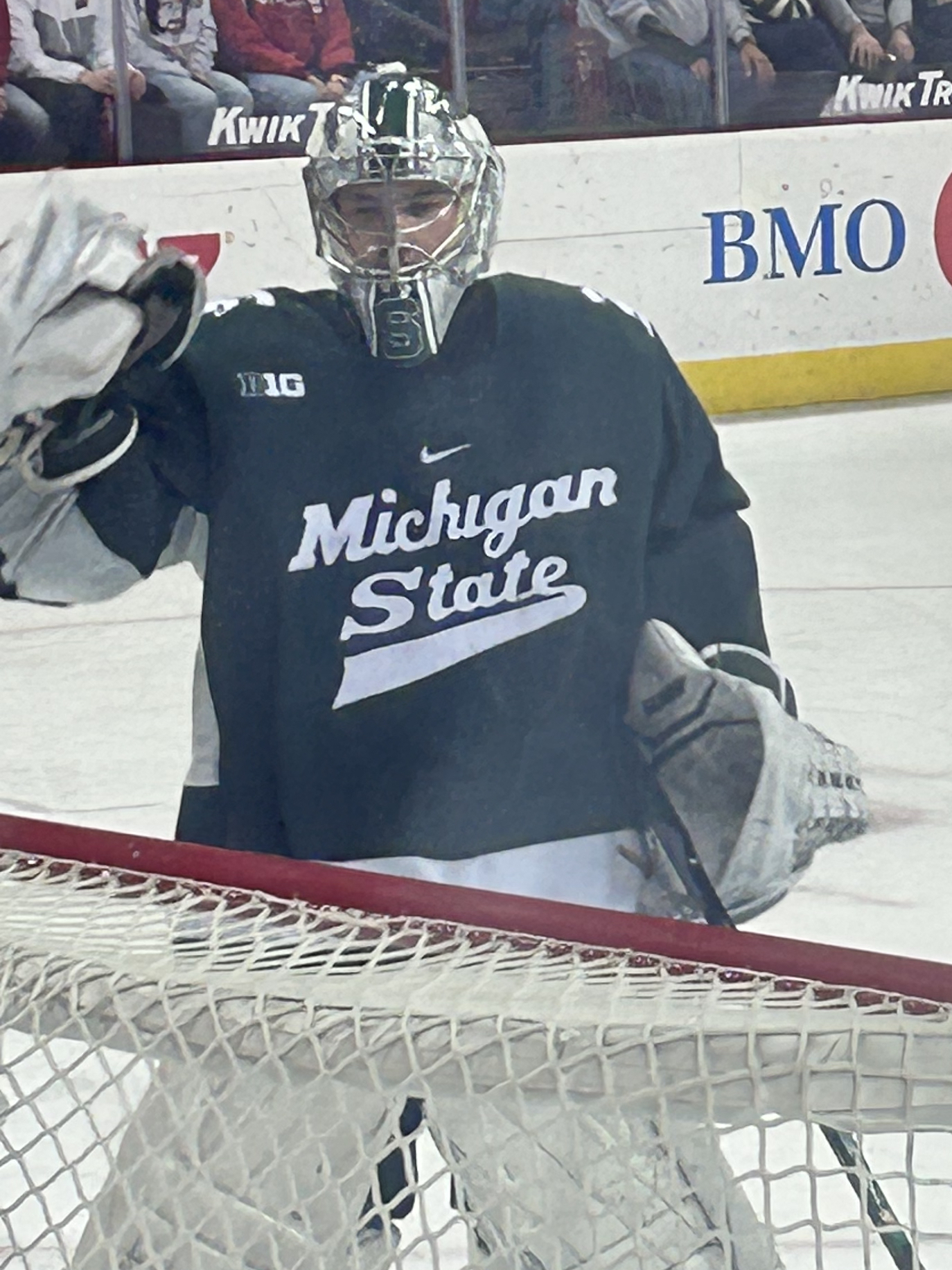
Trey Augustine was selected 41st overall by the Detroit Red Wings.

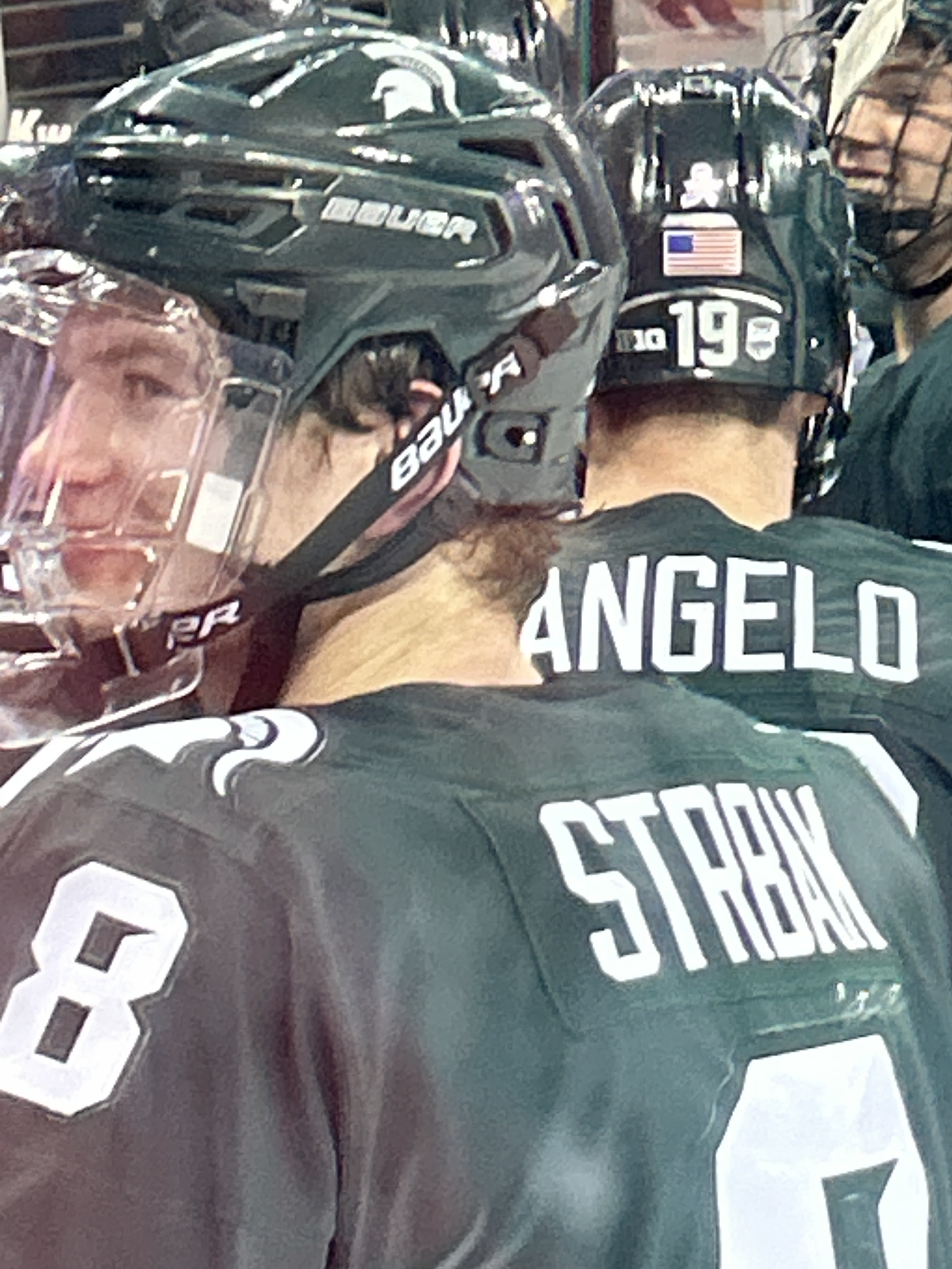
Maxim Strbak was selected 45th overall by the Buffalo Sabres.

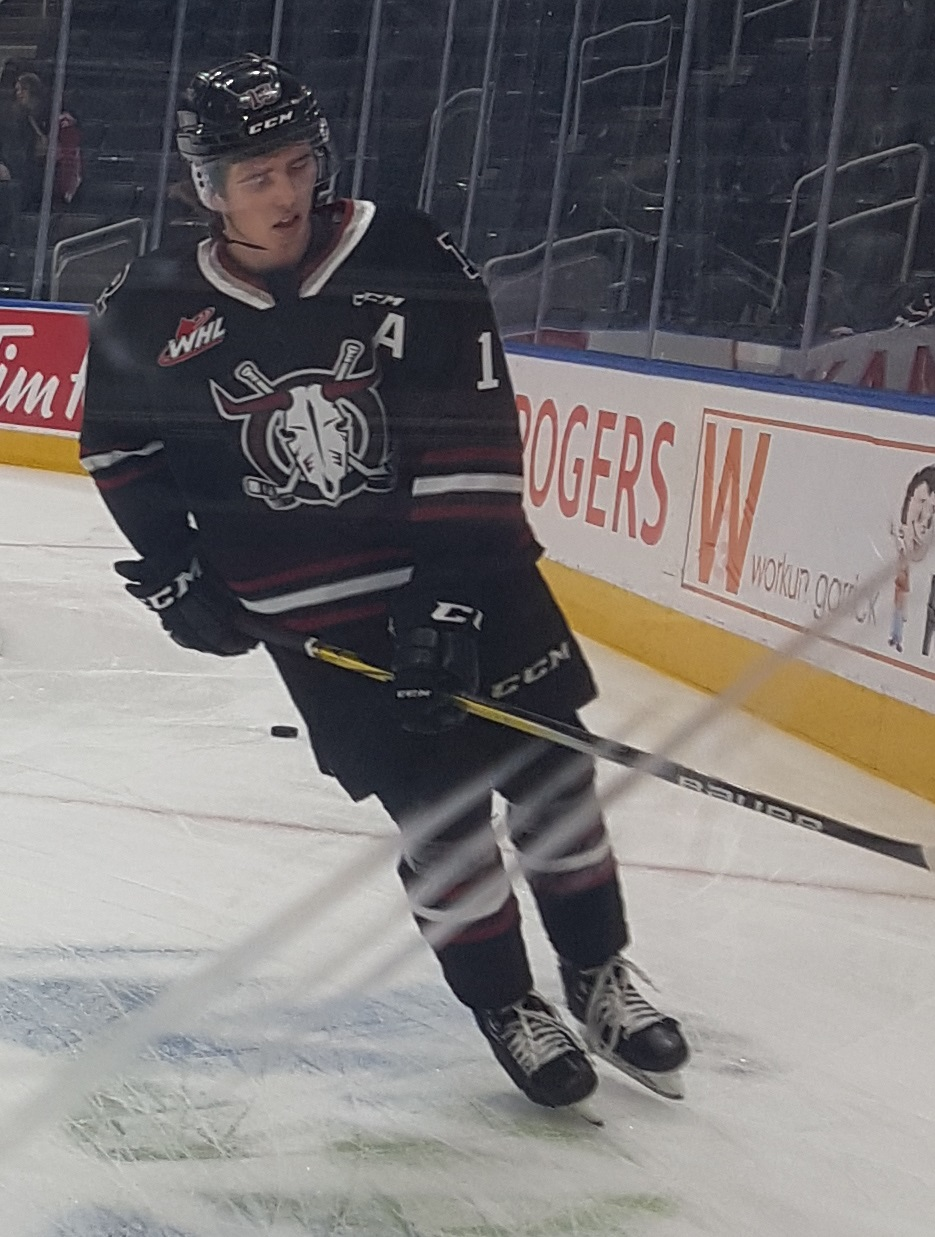
Kalan Lind was selected 46th overall by the Nashville Predators.

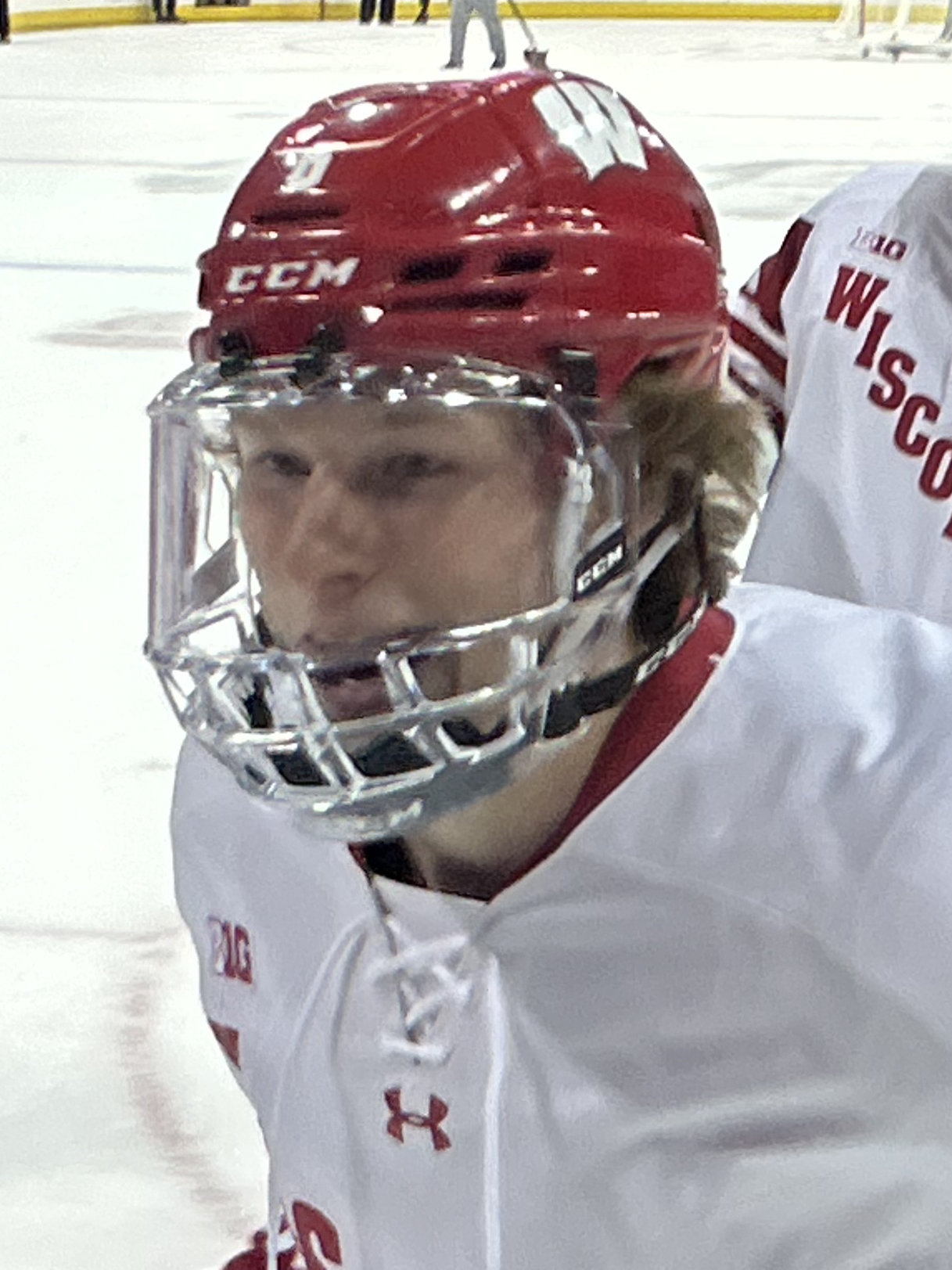
Brady Cleveland was selected 47th overall by the Detroit Red Wings.

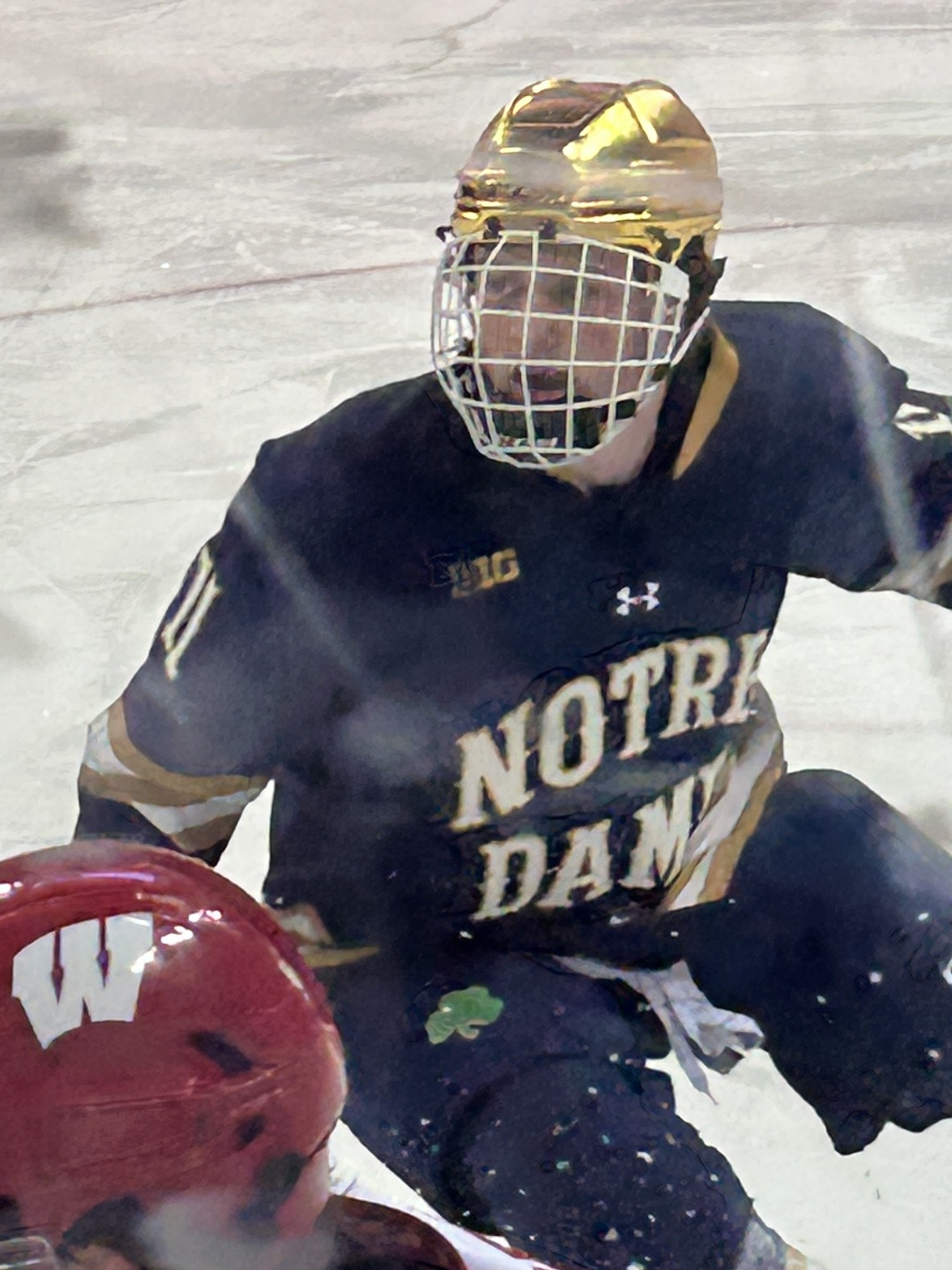
Danny Nelson was selected 49th overall by the New York Islanders.

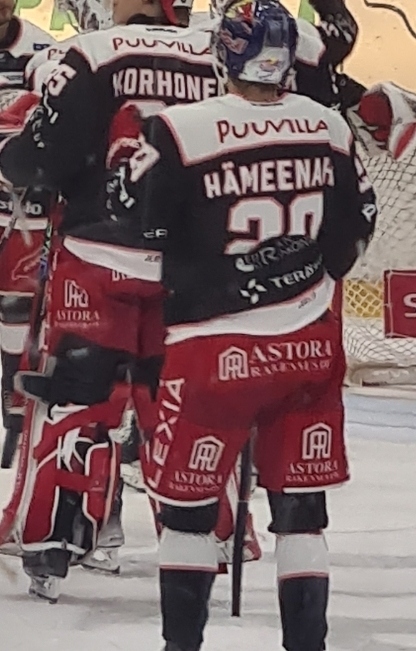
Lenni Hameenaho was selected 58th overall by the New Jersey Devils.

#	Player	Nationality	NHL team	College/junior/club team
33	Nico Myatovic (LW)	Canada	Anaheim Ducks	Seattle Thunderbirds (WHL)
34	Gavin Brindley (C)	United States	Columbus Blue Jackets	Michigan Wolverines (Big Ten)
35	Adam Gajan (G)	Slovakia	Chicago Blackhawks	Chippewa Steel (NAHL)
36	Kasper Halttunen (RW)	Finland	San Jose Sharks	HIFK (Liiga)
37	Ethan Gauthier (RW)	Canada	Tampa Bay Lightning (from Montreal via Colorado)^{1}	Sherbrooke Phoenix (QMJHL)
38	Michael Hrabal (G)	Czech Republic	Arizona Coyotes	Omaha Lancers (USHL)
39	Anton Wahlberg (C)	Sweden	Buffalo Sabres (from Philadelphia)^{2}	Malmo Redhawks (SHL)
40	Andrew Cristall (LW)	Canada	Washington Capitals	Spokane Chiefs (WHL)
41	Trey Augustine (G)	United States	Detroit Red Wings	Michigan State Spartans (Big Ten)
42	Andrew Gibson (D)	Canada	Detroit Red Wings (from St. Louis)^{3}	Sault Ste. Marie Greyhounds (OHL)
43	Felix Nilsson (C)	Sweden	Nashville Predators (from Vancouver via Detroit)^{4}	Rogle BK (J20 Nationell)
44	Roman Kantserov (RW)	Russia	Chicago Blackhawks (from Ottawa)^{5}	Stalnye Lisy (MHL)
45	Maxim Strbak (D)	Slovakia	Buffalo Sabres	Sioux Falls Stampede (USHL)
46	Kalan Lind (LW)	Canada	Nashville Predators (from Pittsburgh)^{6}	Red Deer Rebels (WHL)
47	Brady Cleveland (D)	United States	Detroit Red Wings (from Nashville)^{7}	U.S. NTDP (USHL)
48	Etienne Morin (D)	Canada	Calgary Flames	Moncton Wildcats (QMJHL)
49	Danny Nelson (C)	United States	New York Islanders	U.S. NTDP (USHL)
50	Carson Rehkopf (LW)	Canada	Seattle Kraken (from Winnipeg via Washington)^{8}	Kitchener Rangers (OHL)
51	Carson Bjarnason (G)	Canada	Philadelphia Flyers (from Tampa Bay via Chicago)^{9}	Brandon Wheat Kings (WHL)
52	Oscar Fisker Molgaard (C)	Denmark	Seattle Kraken	HV71 (SHL)
53	Rasmus Kumpulainen (C)	Finland	Minnesota Wild	Lahti Pelicans (U20 SM-sarja)
54	Jakub Dvorak (D)	Czech Republic	Los Angeles Kings	Bili Tygri Liberec (Czech Extraliga)
55	Martin Misiak (RW)	Slovakia	Chicago Blackhawks (from NY Rangers)^{10}	Youngstown Phantoms (USHL)
56	Beau Akey (D)	Canada	Edmonton Oilers	Barrie Colts (OHL)
57	Lukas Dragicevic (D)	Canada	Seattle Kraken (from Toronto)^{11}	Tri-City Americans (WHL)
58	Lenni Hameenaho (RW)	Finland	New Jersey Devils	Porin Assat (Liiga)
59	Carey Terrance (C)	United States	Anaheim Ducks (from Colorado)^{12}	Erie Otters (OHL)
60	Damian Clara (G)	Italy	Anaheim Ducks (from Boston)^{13}	Farjestad BK (J20 Nationell)
61	Tristan Bertucci (D)	Canada	Dallas Stars	Flint Firebirds (OHL)
62	Felix Unger Sorum (RW)	Sweden	Carolina Hurricanes	Leksands IF (J20 Nationell)
63	Gracyn Sawchyn (C)	Canada	Florida Panthers	Seattle Thunderbirds (WHL)
64	Riley Heidt (C)	Canada	Minnesota Wild (from Vegas via Buffalo)^{14}	Prince George Cougars (WHL)

Notes

1. The Montreal Canadiens' second-round pick went to the Tampa Bay Lightning as the result of a trade on June 28, 2023, that sent Ross Colton to Colorado in exchange for this pick.
  Colorado previously acquired this pick as the result of a trade on June 27, 2023, that sent Alex Newhook to Montreal in exchange for Gianni Fairbrother, Florida's first-round pick in 2023 and this pick.
2. The Philadelphia Flyers' second-round pick went to the Buffalo Sabres as the result of a trade on July 23, 2021, that sent Rasmus Ristolainen to Philadelphia in exchange for Robert Hagg, a first-round pick in 2021 and this pick.
3. The St. Louis Blues' second-round pick went to the Detroit Red Wings as the result of a trade on March 21, 2022, that sent Nick Leddy and Luke Witkowski to St. Louis in exchange for Oskar Sundqvist, Jake Walman and this pick.
4. The Vancouver Canucks' second-round pick went to the Nashville Predators as the result of a trade on June 29, 2023, that sent a second-round pick and Tampa Bay's fifth-round pick both in 2023 (47th and 147th overall) to Detroit in exchange for this pick.
  Detroit previously acquired this pick as the result of a trade on March 1, 2023, that sent Filip Hronek and a fourth-round pick in 2023 to Vancouver in exchange for the Islanders' conditional first-round in 2023 and this pick.
5. The Ottawa Senators' second-round pick went to the Chicago Blackhawks as the result of a trade on February 22, 2023, that sent future considerations to Ottawa in exchange for Nikita Zaitsev, a fourth-round pick in 2026 and this pick.
6. The Pittsburgh Penguins' second-round pick went to the Nashville Predators as the result of a trade on March 1, 2023, that sent Mikael Granlund to Pittsburgh in exchange for this pick.
7. The Nashville Predators' second-round pick went to the Detroit Red Wings as the result of a trade on June 29, 2023, that sent Vancouver's second-round pick in 2023 (43rd overall) to Nashville in exchange for Tampa Bay's fifth-round pick in 2023 (147th overall) and this pick.
8. The Winnipeg Jets' second-round pick went to the Seattle Kraken as the result of a trade on July 28, 2021, that sent Vitek Vanecek to Washington in exchange for this pick.
  Washington previously acquired this pick as the result of a trade on July 26, 2021, that sent Brenden Dillon to Winnipeg in exchange for a second-round pick in 2022 and this pick.
9. The Tampa Bay Lightning's second-round pick went to the Philadelphia Flyers as the result of a trade on June 29, 2023, that sent a sixth-round pick in 2023 (167th overall) and Los Angeles' second-round pick in 2024 to Chicago in exchange for this pick.
  Chicago as the result of a trade on July 27, 2021, that sent Brent Seabrook to Tampa Bay in exchange for Tyler Johnson and this pick.
10. The New York Rangers' second-round pick went to the Chicago Blackhawks as the result of a three-team trade on February 28, 2023, that sent Patrick Kane and Cooper Zech to New York in exchange for Andy Welinski, a fourth-round pick in 2025 and this pick (being conditional at the time of the trade). The condition – Chicago will receive a second-round pick in 2023 if the Rangers do not advance to the 2023 Eastern Conference Final – was converted when the Rangers were eliminated from the 2023 Stanley Cup playoffs on May 1, 2023.
11. The Toronto Maple Leafs' second-round pick went to the Seattle Kraken as the result of a trade on March 20, 2022, that sent Mark Giordano and Colin Blackwell to Toronto in exchange for a second-round pick in 2022, a third-round pick in 2024 and this pick.
12. The Colorado Avalanche's second-round pick went to the Anaheim Ducks as the result of a trade on March 14, 2022, that sent Josh Manson to Colorado in exchange for Drew Helleson and this pick.
13. The Boston Bruins' second-round pick went to the Anaheim Ducks as the result of a trade on March 19, 2022, that sent Hampus Lindholm and Kodie Curran to Boston in exchange for Urho Vaakanainen, John Moore, a first-round pick in 2022, a second-round pick in 2024 and this pick.
14. The Vegas Golden Knights' second-round pick went to the Minnesota Wild as the result of a trade on March 3, 2023, that sent Jordan Greenway to Buffalo in exchange for a fifth-round pick in 2024 and this pick.
  Buffalo previously acquired this pick as the result of a trade on November 4, 2021, that sent Jack Eichel and a conditional third-round pick in 2023 to Vegas in exchange for Alex Tuch, Peyton Krebs, a conditional first-round pick in 2022 and this pick (being conditional at the time of the trade). The condition – Buffalo will receive a second-round pick in 2023 if Vegas' first-round pick in 2022 is outside of the top ten selections – was converted when the Golden Knights did not win either draw in the 2022 draft lottery on May 10, 2022.

=== Round three ===
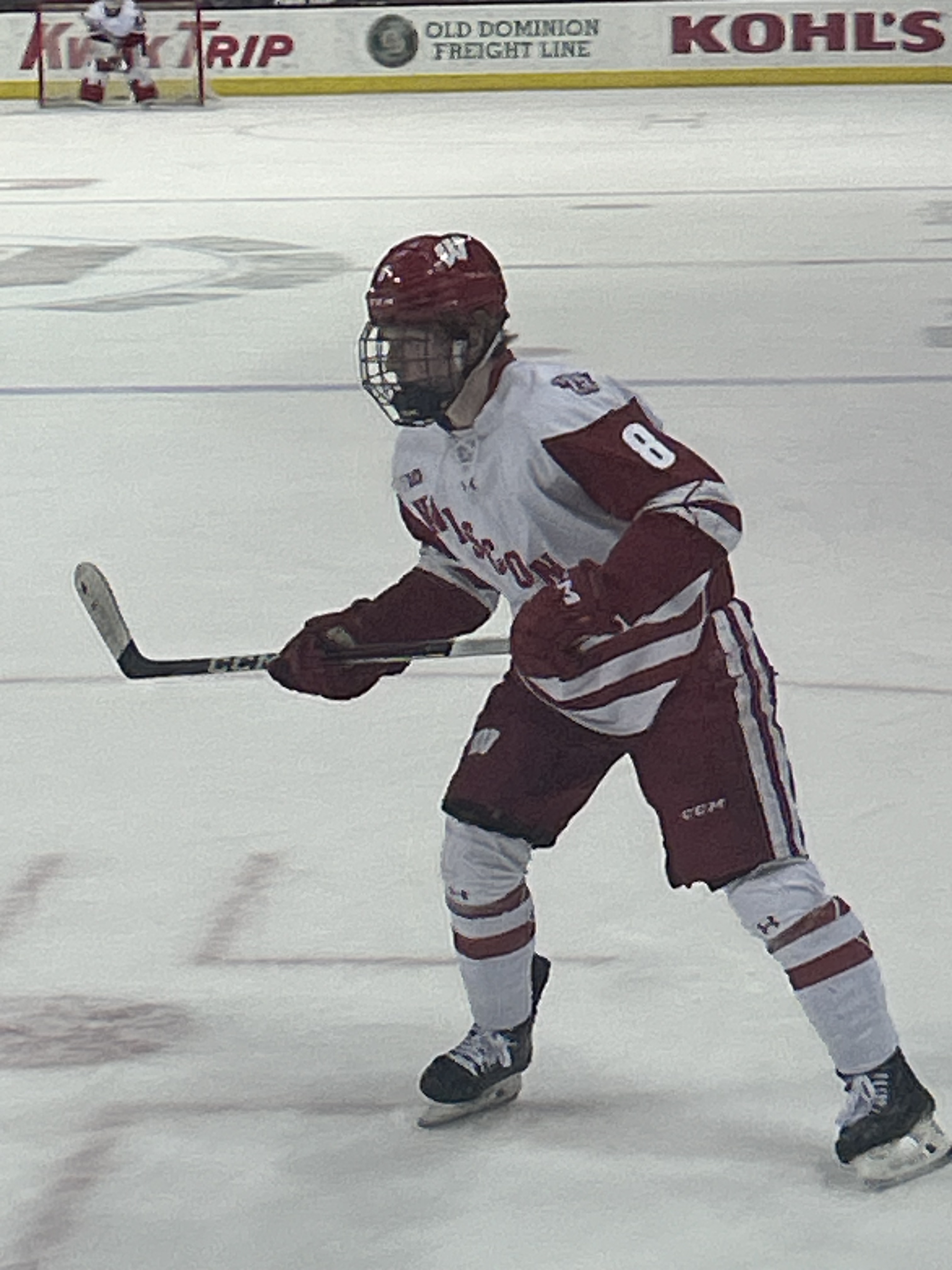
William Whitelaw was selected 66th overall by the Columbus Blue Jackets.

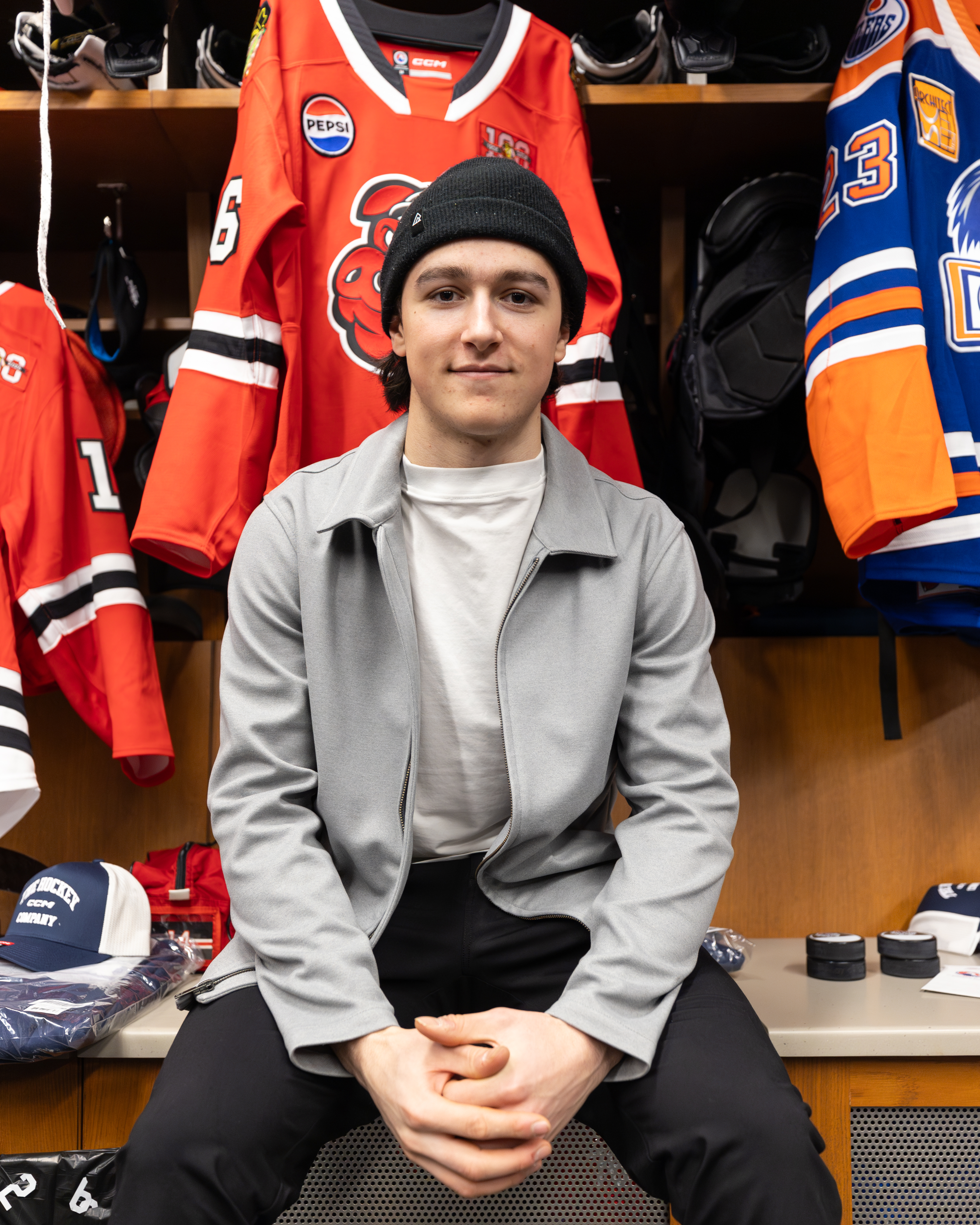
Nick Lardis was selected 67th overall by the Chicago Blackhawks.

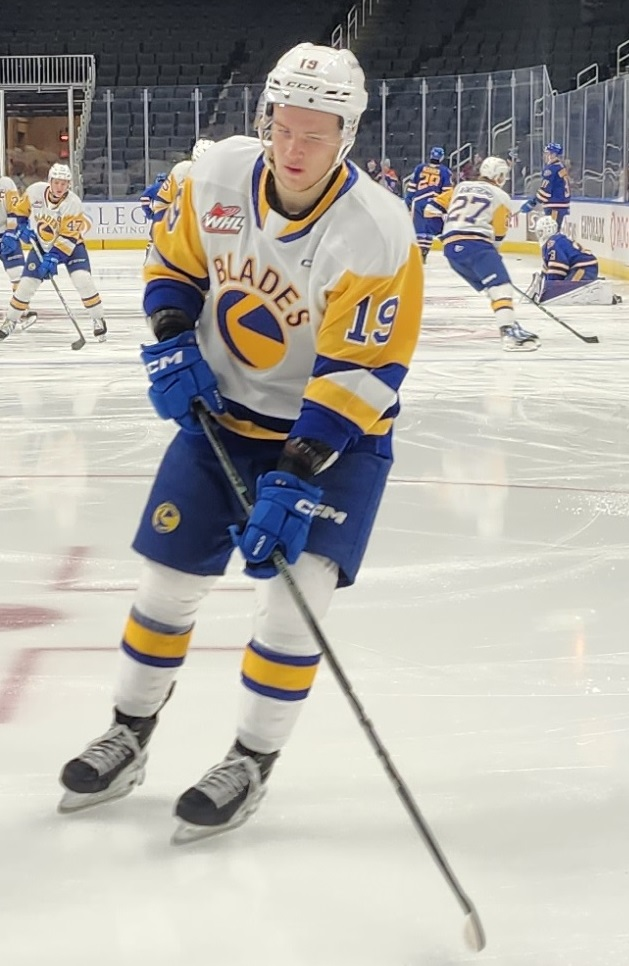
Yegor Sidorov was selected 85th overall by the Anaheim Ducks.

#	Player	Nationality	NHL team	College/junior/club team
65	Coulson Pitre (RW)	Canada	Anaheim Ducks	Flint Firebirds (OHL)
66	William Whitelaw (RW)	United States	Columbus Blue Jackets	Youngstown Phantoms (USHL)
67	Nick Lardis (LW)	Canada	Chicago Blackhawks	Hamilton Bulldogs (OHL)
68	Jesse Kiiskinen (RW)	Finland	Nashville Predators (from San Jose)^{1}	Lahti Pelicans (U20 SM-sarja)
69	Jacob Fowler (G)	United States	Montreal Canadiens	Youngstown Phantoms (USHL)
70	Jonathan Castagna (C)	Canada	Arizona Coyotes	St. Andrew's Saints (CAHS)
71	Brandon Svoboda (C)	United States	San Jose Sharks (from Philadelphia via Carolina)^{2}	Youngstown Phantoms (USHL)
72	Noel Nordh (LW)	Sweden	Arizona Coyotes (from Washington)^{3}	Brynas IF (J20 Nationell)
73	Noah Dower Nilsson (LW)	Sweden	Detroit Red Wings	Frolunda HC (J20 Nationell)
74	Quinton Burns (D)	Canada	St. Louis Blues	Kingston Frontenacs (OHL)
75	Hunter Brzustewicz (D)	United States	Vancouver Canucks	Kitchener Rangers (OHL)
76	Juraj Pekarcik (LW)	Slovakia	St. Louis Blues (from Ottawa via Toronto)^{4}	HK Nitra (Slovak Extraliga)
77	Mathieu Cataford (C)	Canada	Vegas Golden Knights (from Buffalo)^{5}	Halifax Mooseheads (QMJHL)
78	Koehn Ziemmer (RW)	Canada	Los Angeles Kings (from Pittsburgh)^{6}	Prince George Cougars (WHL)
79	Brad Gardiner (C)	Canada	Dallas Stars (from Nashville)^{7}	Ottawa 67's (OHL)
80	Aydar Suniev (LW)	Russia	Calgary Flames (from Calgary via Seattle, Columbus and New Jersey)^{8}	Penticton Vees (BCHL)
81	Tanner Ludtke (C)	United States	Arizona Coyotes (from NY Islanders)^{9}	Lincoln Stars (USHL)
82	Zach Nehring (RW)	United States	Winnipeg Jets	Shattuck-Saint Mary's Sabres (USHS)
83	Dylan Mackinnon (D)	Canada	Nashville Predators (from Tampa Bay)^{10}	Halifax Mooseheads (QMJHL)
84	Caden Price (D)	Canada	Seattle Kraken	Kelowna Rockets (WHL)
85	Yegor Sidorov (RW)	Belarus	Anaheim Ducks (from Minnesota)^{11}	Saskatoon Blades (WHL)
86	Gavin McCarthy (D)	United States	Buffalo Sabres (from Los Angeles)^{12}	Muskegon Lumberjacks (USHL)
87	Yegor Zavragin (G)	Russia	Philadelphia Flyers (from NY Rangers)^{13}	Mamonty Yugry (MHL)
88	Vadim Moroz (RW)	Belarus	Arizona Coyotes (from Edmonton)^{14}	Dinamo Minsk (KHL)
89	Sawyer Mynio (D)	Canada	Vancouver Canucks (from Toronto)^{15}	Seattle Thunderbirds (WHL)
90	Drew Fortescue (D)	United States	New York Rangers (from New Jersey via Pittsburgh)^{16}	Boston College Eagles (Hockey East)
91	Emil Pieniniemi (D)	Finland	Pittsburgh Penguins (from Colorado via NY Rangers)^{17}	Oulun Karpat (Liiga)
92	Christopher Pelosi (C)	United States	Boston Bruins	Sioux Falls Stampede (USHL)
93	Jiri Felcman (C)	Czech Republic	Chicago Blackhawks (from Dallas via Arizona)^{18}	Langnau U20 (U20-Elit)
94	Jayden Perron (RW)	Canada	Carolina Hurricanes (from Carolina via San Jose)^{19}	Chicago Steel (USHL)
95	Denver Barkey (C)	Canada	Philadelphia Flyers (from Florida)^{20}	London Knights (OHL)
96	Arttu Karki (D)	Finland	Vegas Golden Knights	Tappara (U20 SM-sarja)

Notes

1. The San Jose Sharks' third-round pick went to the Nashville Predators as the result of a trade on July 8, 2022, that sent Luke Kunin to San Jose in exchange for John Leonard and this pick.
2. The Philadelphia Flyers' third-round pick went to the San Jose Sharks as the result of a trade on June 29, 2023, that sent Carolina's third-round pick and a fourth-round pick both in 2023 (94th and 100th overall) to Carolina in exchange for this pick.
  Carolina previously acquired this pick as the result of a trade on July 8, 2022, that sent Tony DeAngelo and a seventh-round pick in 2022 to Philadelphia in exchange for a fourth-round pick in 2022, a second-round pick in 2024 and this pick (being conditional at the time of the trade). The condition – Carolina will receive the highest of the Flyers', Rangers' or Panthers' third-round picks in 2023 – was converted when the Rangers and Panthers both qualified for the 2023 Stanley Cup playoffs, ensuring that the Flyers' third-round pick would be the highest, on March 27, 2023, and April 11, 2023, respectively.
3. The Washington Capitals' third-round pick went to the Arizona Coyotes as the result of a trade on March 21, 2022, that sent Johan Larsson to Washington in exchange for this pick.
4. The Ottawa Senators' third-round pick went to the St. Louis Blues as the result of a trade on February 17, 2023, that sent Ryan O'Reilly, Noel Acciari, and Josh Pillar to Toronto in exchange for Adam Gaudette, Mikhail Abramov, a first-round pick in 2023, a second-round pick in 2024 and this pick.
  Toronto previously acquired this pick as the result of a trade on July 11, 2022, that sent future considerations to Ottawa in exchange for Matt Murray, a seventh-round pick in 2024 and this pick.
5. The Buffalo Sabres' third-round pick went to the Vegas Golden Knights as the result of a trade on November 4, 2021, that sent Alex Tuch, Peyton Krebs, a conditional first-round pick in 2022 and a conditional second-round pick in 2023 to Buffalo in exchange for Jack Eichel and this pick (being conditional at the time of the trade). The condition – Vegas will receive a third-round pick in 2023 if Vegas' first-round pick in 2022 is outside of the top ten selections – was converted when the Golden Knights did not win either draw in the 2022 draft lottery on May 10, 2022.
6. The Pittsburgh Penguins' third-round pick went to the Los Angeles Kings as the result of a trade on April 12, 2021, that sent Jeff Carter to Pittsburgh in exchange for a conditional third-round pick in 2022 and this pick (being conditional at the time of the trade). The condition – Los Angeles will receive a third-round pick in 2023 if Carter plays in 50 or more games for Pittsburgh during the 2021–22 NHL season – was converted on March 3, 2022.
7. The Nashville Predators' third-round pick went to the Dallas Stars as the result of a trade on June 29, 2023, that sent a third and sixth-round pick both in 2024 to Nashville in exchange for this pick.
8. The Calgary Flames' third-round pick was re-acquired as the result of a trade on June 27, 2023, that sent Tyler Toffoli to New Jersey in exchange for Yegor Sharangovich and this pick.
  New Jersey previously acquired this pick as the result of a trade on June 9, 2023, that sent Damon Severson to Columbus in exchange for this pick.
  Columbus previously acquired this pick as the result of a trade on July 22, 2022, that sent Oliver Bjorkstrand to Seattle in exchange for Winnipeg's fourth-round pick in 2023 and this pick.
  Seattle previously acquired this pick as the result of a trade on March 16, 2022, that sent Calle Jarnkrok to Calgary in exchange for Florida's second-round pick in 2022, a seventh-round pick in 2024 and this pick.
9. The New York Islanders' third-round pick went to the Arizona Coyotes as the result of a trade on July 17, 2021, that sent future considerations to New York in exchange for Andrew Ladd, Colorado's second-round pick in 2021, a conditional second-round pick in 2022, and this pick (being conditional at the time of the trade). The condition – Arizona will receive a third-round pick in 2023 if Ladd failed to play in at least one professional game while under contract to the Coyotes during the 2022–23 season – was converted when Ladd failed his physical and was placed on long-term injured reserve on September 22, 2022.
10. The Tampa Bay Lightning's third-round pick went to the Nashville Predators as the result of a trade on February 26, 2023, that sent Tanner Jeannot to Tampa Bay in exchange for Cal Foote, a conditional first-round pick in 2025, a second-round pick in 2024, a fourth and fifth-round pick both in 2023 and this pick.
11. The Minnesota Wild's third-round pick went to the Anaheim Ducks as the result of a trade on March 19, 2022, that sent Nicolas Deslauriers to Minnesota in exchange for this pick.
12. The Los Angeles Kings' third-round pick went to the Buffalo Sabres as the result of a trade on March 1, 2023, that sent Erik Portillo to Los Angeles in exchange for this pick.
13. The New York Rangers' third-round pick went to the Philadelphia Flyers as the result of a trade on March 21, 2022, that sent Justin Braun to New York in exchange for this pick.
14. The Edmonton Oilers' third-round pick went to the Arizona Coyotes as the result of a trade on March 2, 2023, that sent Nick Bjugstad and Cam Dineen to Edmonton in exchange for Michael Kesselring and this pick.
15. The Toronto Maple Leafs' third-round pick went to the Vancouver Canucks as the result of a trade on February 28, 2023, that sent Luke Schenn to Toronto in exchange for this pick.
16. The New Jersey Devils' third-round pick went to the New York Rangers as the result of a trade on June 29, 2023, that sent Colorado's third-round pick in 2023 (91st overall) and a seventh-round pick in 2024 to Pittsburgh in exchange for this pick.
  Pittsburgh previously acquired this pick as the result of a trade on July 16, 2022, that sent John Marino to New Jersey in exchange for Ty Smith and this pick.
17. The Colorado Avalanche's third-round pick went to the Pittsburgh Penguins as the result of a trade on June 29, 2023, that sent New Jersey's third-round pick in 2023 (90th overall) to New York in exchange for a seventh-round pick in 2024 and this pick.
  The Rangers previously acquired this pick as the result of a trade on July 7, 2022, that sent Alexandar Georgiev to Colorado in exchange for a third and fifth-round pick both in 2022 and this pick.
18. The Dallas Stars' third-round pick went to the Chicago Blackhawks as the result of a trade on July 8, 2022, that sent Edmonton's third-round pick in 2022 to Arizona in exchange for this pick.
  Arizona previously acquired this pick as the result of a trade on March 20, 2022, that sent Scott Wedgewood to Dallas in exchange for this pick (being conditional at the time of the trade). The condition – Arizona will receive a third-round pick in 2023 if Dallas qualifies for the 2022 Stanley Cup playoffs – was converted on April 27, 2022.
19. The Carolina Hurricanes' third-round pick was re-acquired as the result of a trade on June 29, 2023, that sent Philadelphia's third-round pick in 2023 (71st overall) to San Jose in exchange for a fourth-round pick in 2023 (100th overall) and this pick.
  San Jose previously acquired this pick as the result of a trade on July 13, 2022, that sent Brent Burns and Lane Pederson to Carolina in exchange for Steven Lorentz, Eetu Makiniemi and this pick (being conditional at the time of the trade). The condition – San Jose will receive the lowest of the Flyers' or Hurricanes' third-round picks in 2023 – was converted when Carolina qualified for the 2023 Stanley Cup playoffs, ensuring that their third-round pick would be the lowest, on March 23, 2023.
20. The Florida Panthers' third-round pick went to the Philadelphia Flyers pick as the result of a trade on March 19, 2022, that sent Claude Giroux, German Rubtsov, Connor Bunnaman and a fifth-round pick in 2024 to Florida in exchange for Owen Tippett, a conditional first-round pick in 2024 and this pick.

=== Round four ===
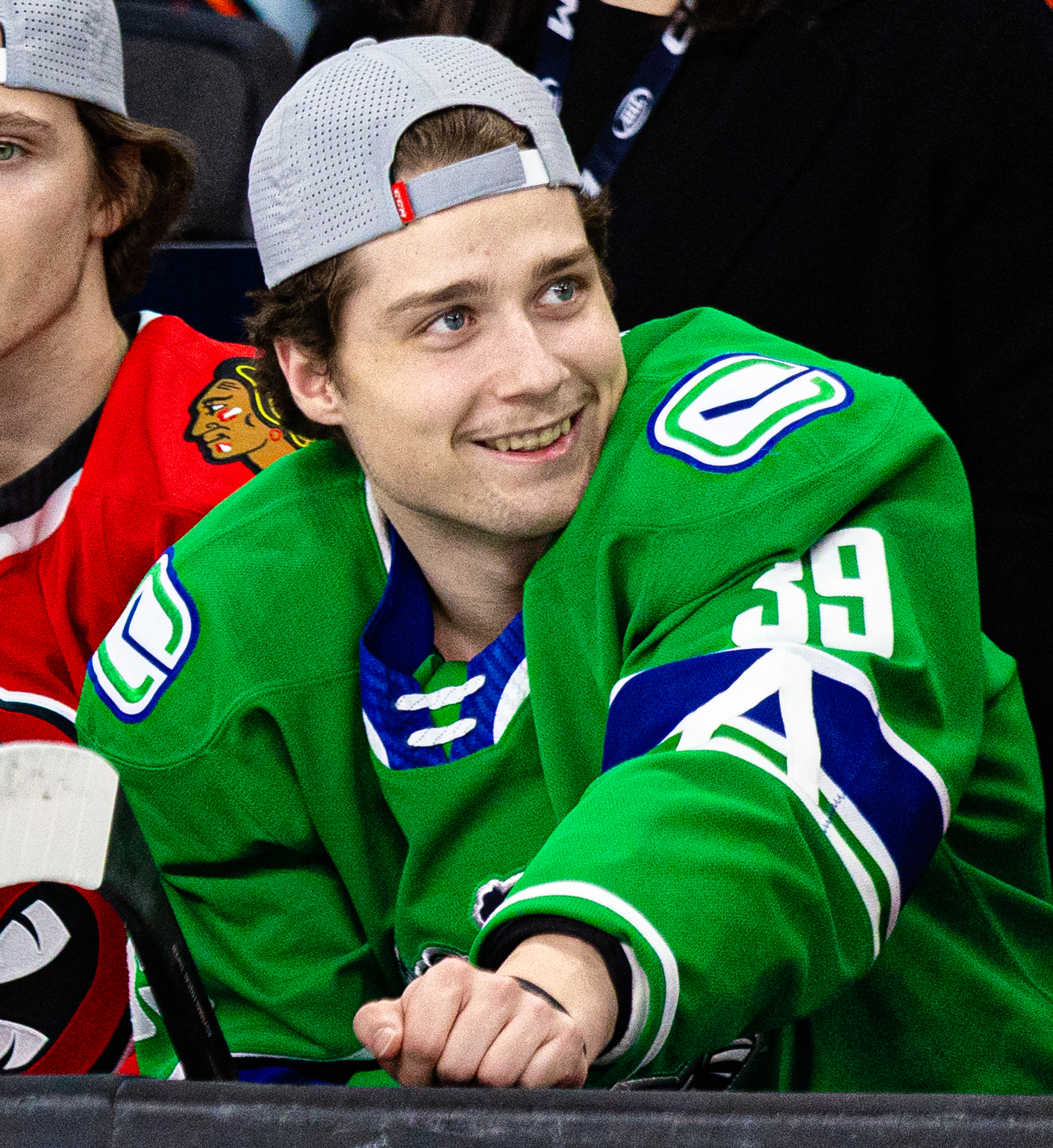
Ty Mueller was selected 105th overall by the Vancouver Canucks.

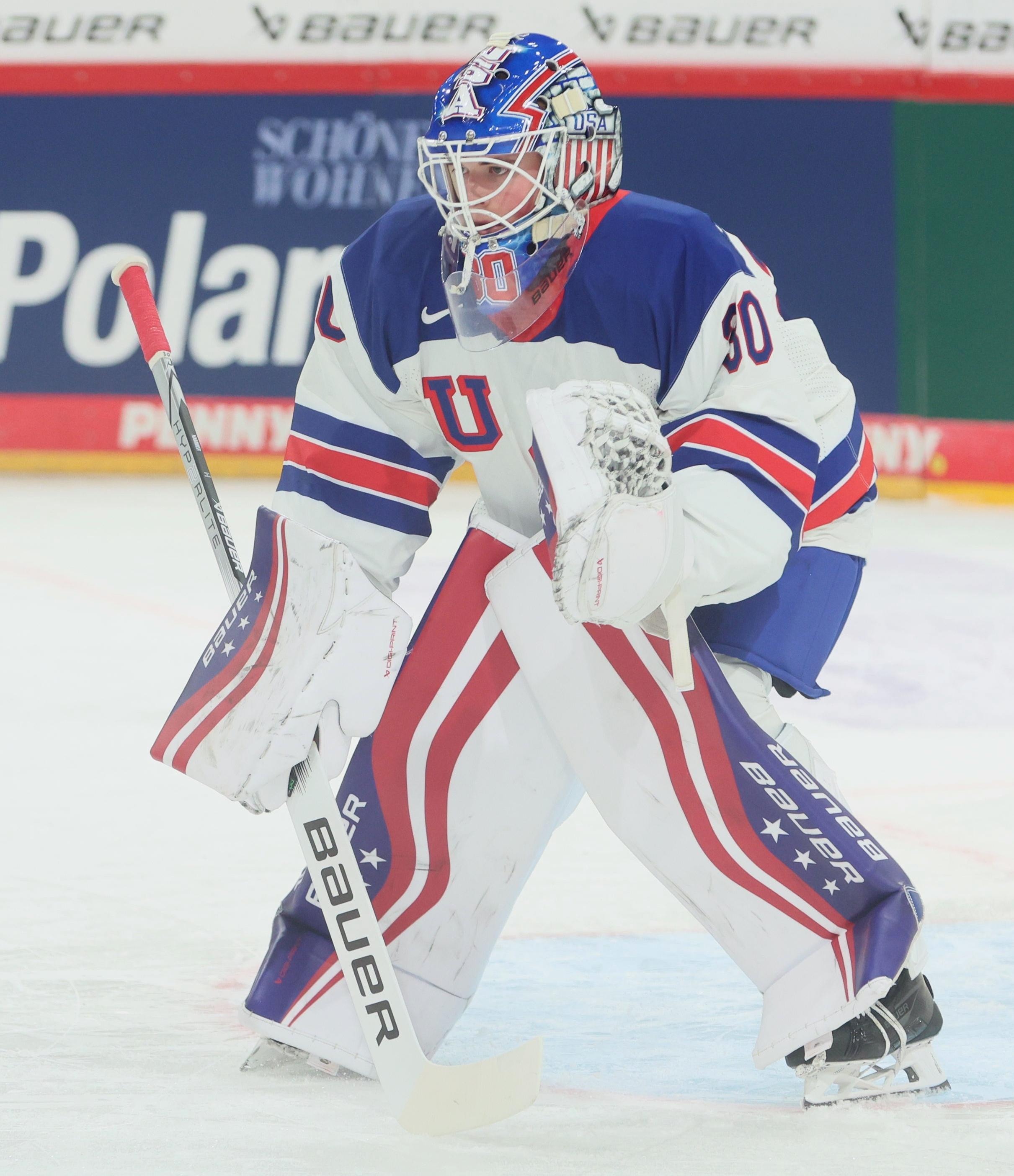
Hampton Slukynsky was selected 118th overall by the Los Angeles Kings.

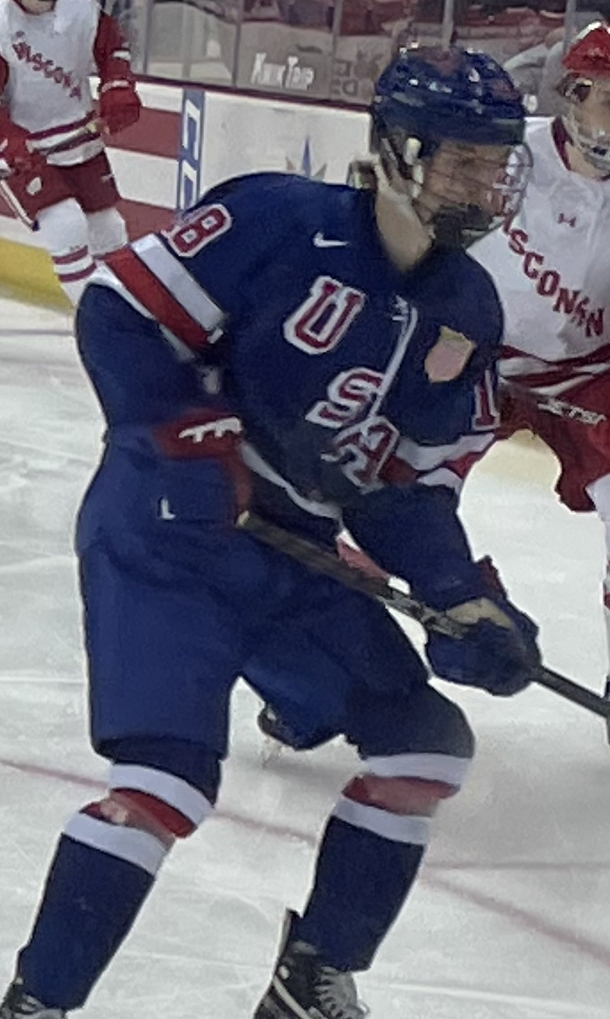
Beckett Hendrickson was selected 124th overall by the Boston Bruins.

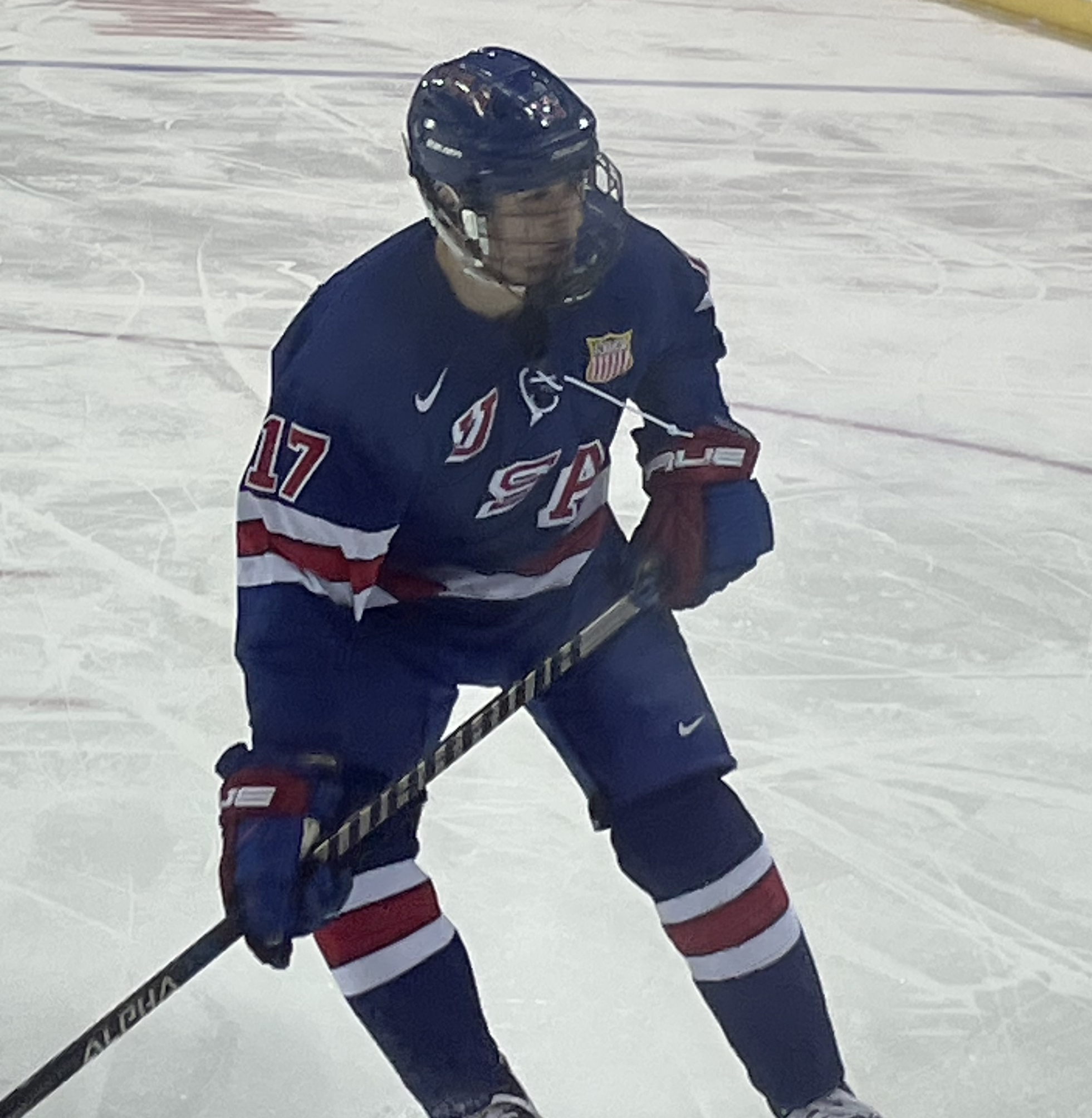
Aram Minnetian was selected 125th overall by the Dallas Stars.

#	Player	Nationality	NHL team	College/junior/club team
97	Konnor Smith (D)	Canada	Anaheim Ducks	Peterborough Petes (OHL)
98	Andrew Strathmann (D)	United States	Columbus Blue Jackets	Youngstown Phantoms (USHL)
99	Alex Pharand (C)	Canada	Chicago Blackhawks	Sudbury Wolves (OHL)
100	Alexander Rykov (RW)	Russia	Carolina Hurricanes (from San Jose)^{1}	Chelmet Chelyabinsk (VHL)
101	Florian Xhekaj (LW)	Canada	Montreal Canadiens	Hamilton Bulldogs (OHL)
102	Terrell Goldsmith (D)	Canada	Arizona Coyotes	Prince Albert Raiders (WHL)
103	Cole Knuble (C)	United States	Philadelphia Flyers	Fargo Force (USHL)
104	Patrick Thomas (C)	Canada	Washington Capitals	Hamilton Bulldogs (OHL)
105	Ty Mueller (C)	Canada	Vancouver Canucks (from Detroit)^{2}	Omaha Mavericks (NCHC)
106	Jakub Stancl (C)	Czech Republic	St. Louis Blues	Vaxjo Lakers (J20 Nationell)
107	Vilmer Alriksson (LW)	Sweden	Vancouver Canucks	Djurgardens IF (J20 Nationell)
108	Hoyt Stanley (D)	Canada	Ottawa Senators	Victoria Grizzlies (BCHL)
109	Ethan Miedema (LW)	Canada	Buffalo Sabres	Kingston Frontenacs (OHL)
110	Bogdan Konyushkov (D)	Russia	Montreal Canadiens (from Pittsburgh)^{3}	Torpedo Nizhny Novgorod (KHL)
111	Joey Willis (C)	United States	Nashville Predators	Saginaw Spirit (OHL)
112	Jaden Lipinski (C)	United States	Calgary Flames	Vancouver Giants (WHL)
113	Jesse Nurmi (LW)	Finland	New York Islanders	KooKoo (Liiga)
114	Luca Pinelli (C)	Canada	Columbus Blue Jackets (from Winnipeg via Seattle)^{4}	Ottawa 67's (OHL)
115	Jayson Shaugabay (RW)	United States	Tampa Bay Lightning (from Tampa Bay via Nashville)^{5}	Green Bay Gamblers (USHL)
116	Andrei Loshko (C)	Belarus	Seattle Kraken	Chicoutimi Sagueneens (QMJHL)
117	Larry Keenan (D)	Canada	Detroit Red Wings (from Minnesota)^{6}	Culver Academy Eagles (USHS)
118	Hampton Slukynsky (G)	United States	Los Angeles Kings	U.S. NTDP (USHL)
119	Matthew Perkins (C)	Canada	Vancouver Canucks (from NY Rangers)^{7}	Youngstown Phantoms (USHL)
120	Alex Ciernik (LW)	Slovakia	Philadelphia Flyers (from Edmonton)^{8}	Sodertalje SK (HockeyAllsvenskan)
121	Juha Jatkola (G)	Finland	Nashville Predators (from Toronto)^{9}	KalPa (Liiga)
122	Cam Squires (RW)	Canada	New Jersey Devils	Cape Breton Eagles (QMJHL)
123	Luca Cagnoni (D)	Canada	San Jose Sharks (from Colorado via Seattle)^{10}	Portland Winterhawks (WHL)
124	Beckett Hendrickson (C)	United States	Boston Bruins	U.S. NTDP (USHL)
125	Aram Minnetian (D)	United States	Dallas Stars	U.S. NTDP (USHL)
126	Stanislav Yarovoi (RW)	Russia	Carolina Hurricanes	HC Vityaz (KHL)
127	Albert Wikman (D)	Sweden	Florida Panthers	Farjestad BK (J20 Nationell)
128	Quentin Miller (G)	Canada	Montreal Canadiens (from Vegas)^{11}	Quebec Remparts (QMJHL)

Notes

1. The San Jose Sharks' fourth-round pick went to the Carolina Hurricanes as the result of a trade on June 29, 2023, that sent Philadelphia's third-round pick in 2023 (71st overall) to San Jose in exchange for Carolina's third-round pick in 2023 (94th overall) and this pick.
2. The Detroit Red Wings' fourth-round pick went to the Vancouver Canucks as the result of a trade on March 1, 2023 that sent the Islanders' conditional first-round pick and a second-round pick both in 2023 to Detroit in exchange for Filip Hronek and this pick.
3. The Pittsburgh Penguins' fourth-round pick went to the Montreal Canadiens as the result of a trade on July 16, 2022, that sent Jeff Petry and Ryan Poehling to Pittsburgh in exchange for Mike Matheson and this pick.
4. The Winnipeg Jets' fourth-round pick went to the Columbus Blue Jackets as the result of a trade on July 22, 2022, that sent Oliver Bjorkstrand to Seattle in exchange for Calgary's third-round pick in 2023 and this pick.
  Seattle previously acquired this pick as the result of a trade on March 20, 2022, that sent Mason Appleton to Winnipeg in exchange for this pick.
5. The Tampa Bay Lightning's fourth-round pick was re-acquired as the result of a trade on June 29, 2023, that sent Chicago's fourth-round pick in 2024 to Tampa Bay in exchange for this pick.
  Nashville previously acquired this pick as the result of a trade on February 26, 2023, that sent Tanner Jeannot to Tampa Bay in exchange for Cal Foote, a conditional first-round pick in 2025, a second-round pick in 2024, a third and fifth-round pick both in 2023 and this pick.
6. The Minnesota Wild's fourth-round pick went to the Detroit Red Wings as the result of a trade on March 3, 2023, that sent Oskar Sundqvist to Minnesota in exchange for this pick.
7. The New York Rangers' fourth-round pick went to the Vancouver Canucks as the result of a trade on March 21, 2022, that sent Tyler Motte to New York in exchange for this pick.
8. The Edmonton Oilers' fourth-round pick went to the Philadelphia Flyers as the result of a trade on March 21, 2022, that sent Derick Brassard to Edmonton in exchange for this pick.
9. The Toronto Maple Leafs' fourth-round pick went to the Nashville Predators as the result of a trade on July 8, 2022, that sent Toronto's fourth-round pick in 2022 to Toronto in exchange for this pick.
10. The Colorado Avalanche's fourth-round pick went to the San Jose Sharks as the result of a trade on February 5, 2023, that sent Jaycob Megna to Seattle in exchange for this pick (being conditional at the time of the trade. The condition – San Jose will receive either the Avalanche's or Kraken's fourth-round pick in 2023, at Seattle’s choice – the date of conversion is unknown.
  Seattle previously acquired this pick as the result of a trade on July 27, 2021, that sent Kurtis MacDermid to Colorado in exchange for this pick.
11. The Vegas Golden Knights' fourth-round pick went to the Montreal Canadiens as the result of a trade on July 8, 2022, that sent Tampa Bay's fourth-round pick in 2022 to Vegas in exchange for this pick.

=== Round five ===
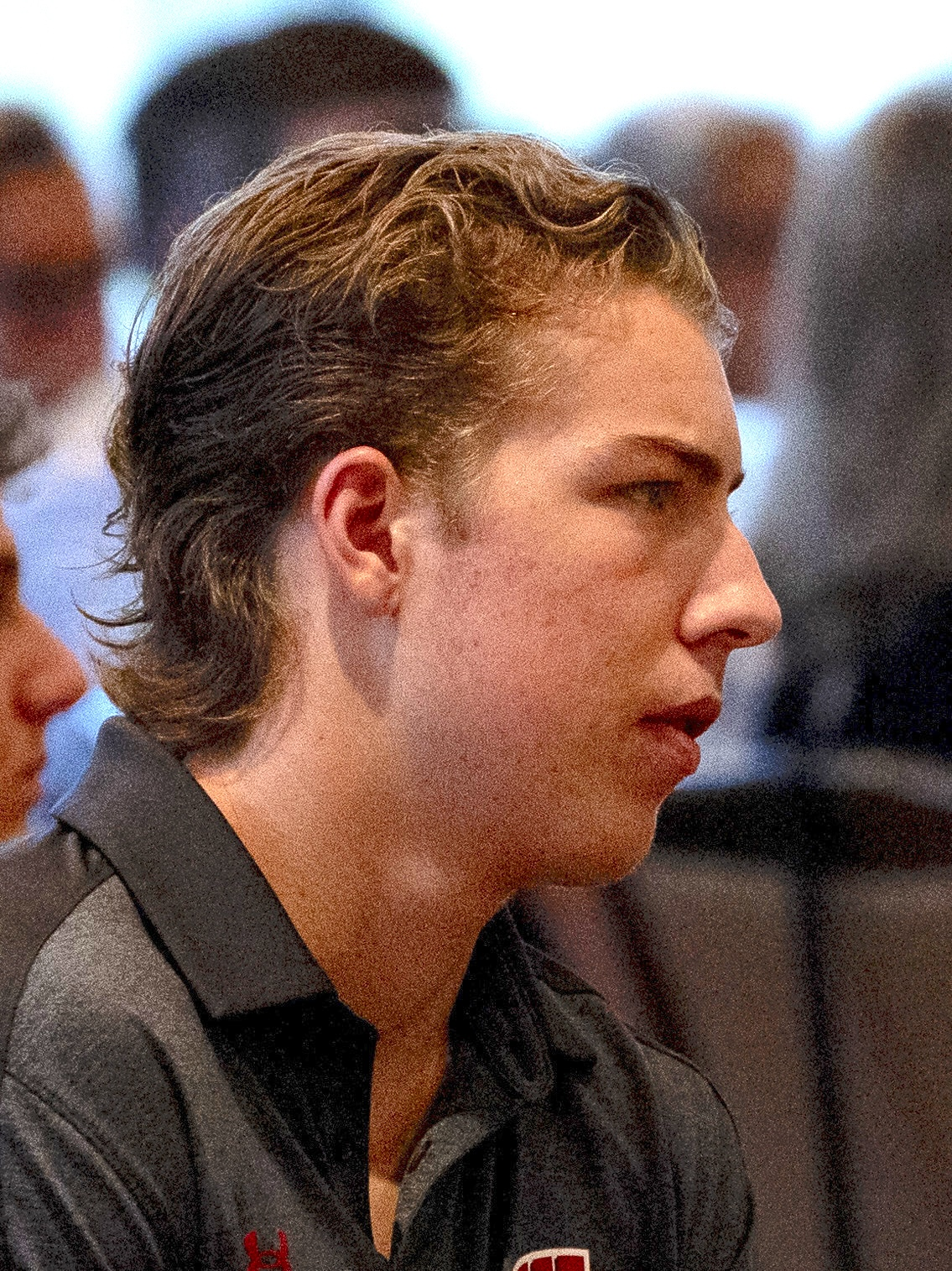
Jack Phelan was selected 137th overall by the Detroit Red Wings.

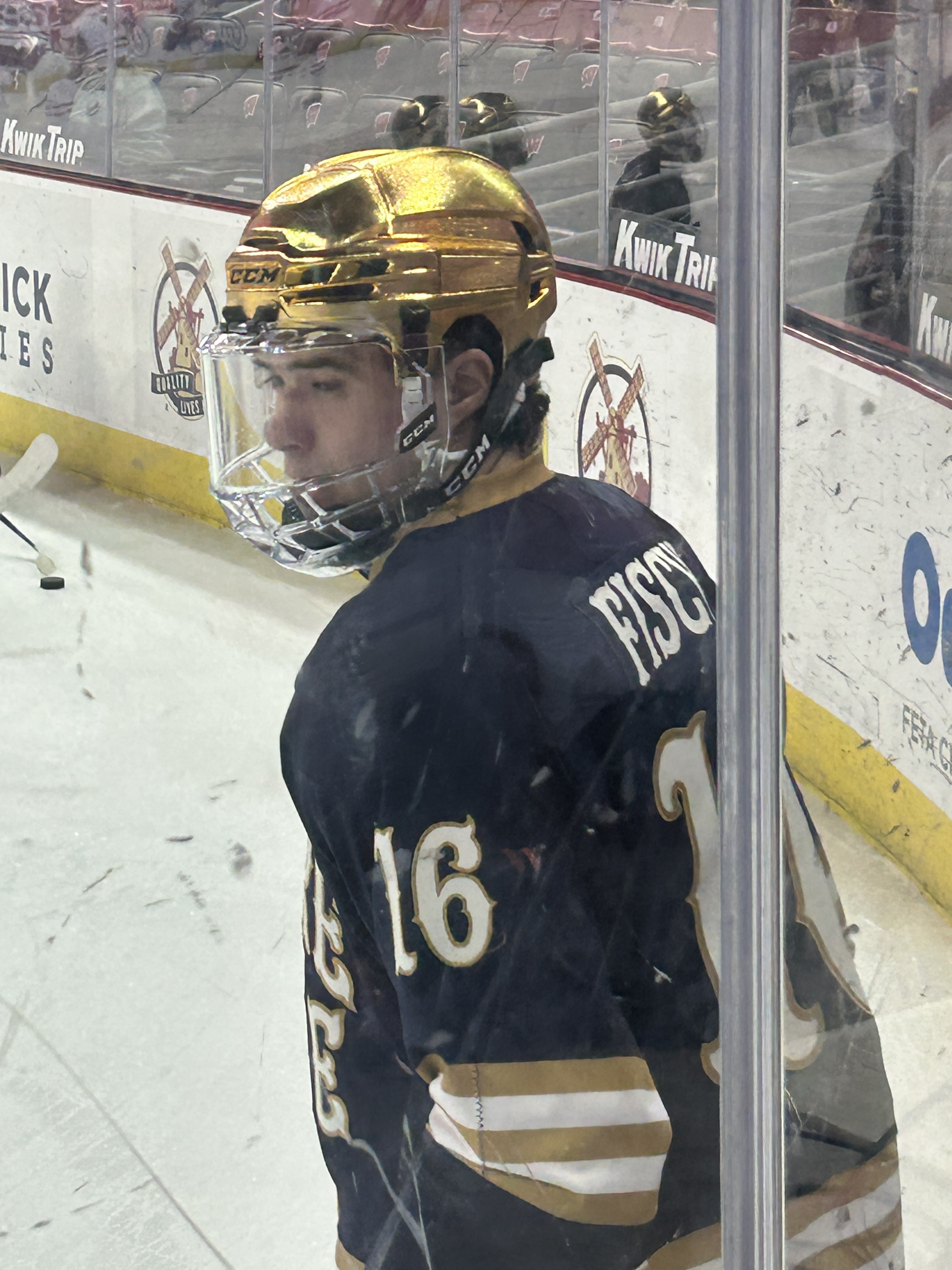
Paul Fischer was selected 138th overall by the St. Louis Blues.

#	Player	Nationality	NHL team	College/junior/club team
129	Rodwin Dionicio (D)	Switzerland	Anaheim Ducks	Niagara IceDogs (OHL)
130	Axel Landen (D)	Sweden	San Jose Sharks (from Columbus)^{1}	HV71 (J20 Nationell)
131	Marcel Marcel (LW)	Czech Republic	Chicago Blackhawks	Gatineau Olympiques (QMJHL)
132	Eric Pohlkamp (D)	United States	San Jose Sharks	Cedar Rapids RoughRiders (USHL)
133	Sam Harris (LW)	United States	Montreal Canadiens	Sioux Falls Stampede (USHL)
134	Melker Thelin (G)	Sweden	Arizona Coyotes	Tegs SK (Hockeyettan)
135	Carter Sotheran (D)	Canada	Philadelphia Flyers	Portland Winterhawks (WHL)
136	Cameron Allen (D)	Canada	Washington Capitals	Guelph Storm (OHL)
137	Jack Phelan (D)	United States	Detroit Red Wings	Sioux Falls Stampede (USHL)
138	Paul Fischer (D)	United States	St. Louis Blues	U.S. NTDP (USHL)
139	Charles-Alexis Legault (D)	Canada	Carolina Hurricanes (from Vancouver)^{2}	West Kelowna Warriors (BCHL)
140	Matthew Andonovski (D)	Canada	Ottawa Senators	Kitchener Rangers (OHL)
141	Scott Ratzlaff (G)	Canada	Buffalo Sabres	Seattle Thunderbirds (WHL)
142	Mikhail Ilyin (RW)	Russia	Pittsburgh Penguins	Almaz Cherepovets (MHL)
143	Sutter Muzzatti (C)	United States	Nashville Predators	RPI Engineers (ECAC)
144	Yevgeni Volokhin (G)	Russia	Montreal Canadiens (from Calgary)^{3}	Mamonty Yugry (MHL)
145	Justin Gill (C)	Canada	New York Islanders	Sherbrooke Phoenix (QMJHL)
146	Jacob Julien (C)	Canada	Winnipeg Jets	London Knights (OHL)
147	Kevin Bicker (LW)	Germany	Detroit Red Wings (from Tampa Bay via Nashville)^{4}	Jungadler Mannheim (DNL U20)
148	Kaden Hammell (D)	Canada	Seattle Kraken	Everett Silvertips (WHL)
149	Aaron Pionk (D)	United States	Minnesota Wild	Waterloo Black Hawks (USHL)
150	Matthew Mania (D)	United States	Los Angeles Kings	Sudbury Wolves (OHL)
151	Thomas Milic (G)	Canada	Winnipeg Jets (from NY Rangers)^{5}	Seattle Thunderbirds (WHL)
152	Rasmus Larsson (D)	Sweden	NY Rangers (from Edmonton)^{6}	Vasteras IK (J20 Nationell)
153	Hudson Malinoski (C)	Canada	Toronto Maple Leafs	Brooks Bandits (AJHL)
154	Chase Cheslock (D)	United States	New Jersey Devils	Omaha Lancers (USHL)
155	Nikita Ishimnikov (D)	Russia	Colorado Avalanche	Avto Yekaterinburg (MHL)
156	Melvin Strahl (G)	Sweden	Columbus Blue Jackets (from Boston via Minnesota)^{7}	Modo Hockey (J20 Nationell)
157	Arno Tiefensee (G)	Germany	Dallas Stars	Adler Mannheim (DEL)
158	Ruslan Khazheyev (G)	Russia	Carolina Hurricanes	Belye Medvedi Chelyabinsk (MHL)
159	Olof Glifford (G)	Sweden	Florida Panthers	HV71 (J20 Nationell)
160	Justin Kipkie (D)	Canada	Arizona Coyotes (from Vegas)^{8}	Victoria Royals (WHL)

Notes

1. The Columbus Blue Jackets' fifth-round pick went to the San Jose Sharks as the result of a trade on July 8, 2022, that sent Buffalo's fifth-round pick in 2022 to Columbus in exchange for this pick.
2. The Vancouver Canucks' fifth-round pick went to the Carolina Hurricanes as the result of a trade on October 28, 2022, that sent Ethan Bear and Lane Pederson to Vancouver in exchange for this pick.
3. The Calgary Flames' fifth-round pick went to the Montreal Canadiens as the result of a trade on February 14, 2022, that sent Tyler Toffoli to Calgary in exchange for Tyler Pitlick, Emil Heineman, a conditional first-round pick in 2022, a conditional fourth-round pick in 2024 and this pick.
4. The Tampa Bay Lightning's fifth-round pick went to the Detroit Red Wings as the result of a trade on June 29, 2023, that sent Vancouver's second-round pick in 2023 (43rd overall) to Nashville in exchange for a second-round pick in 2023 (47th overall) and this pick.
  Nashville previously acquired this pick as the result of a trade on February 26, 2023, that sent Tanner Jeannot to Tampa Bay in exchange for Cal Foote, a conditional first-round pick in 2025, a second-round pick in 2024, a third and fourth-round pick both in 2023 and this pick.
5. The New York Rangers' fifth-round pick went to the Winnipeg Jets as the result of a trade on March 21, 2022, that sent Andrew Copp and a sixth-round pick in 2023 to New York in exchange for Morgan Barron, two conditional second-round picks in 2022 and this pick.
6. The Edmonton Oilers' fifth-round pick went to the New York Rangers as a result of the trade on May 31, 2023, that sent Jayden Grubbe to Edmonton in exchange for this pick.
7. The Boston Bruins' fifth-round pick went to the Columbus Blue Jackets as the result of a trade on February 28, 2023, that sent Gustav Nyquist to Minnesota in exchange for this pick.
  Minnesota previously acquired this pick as the result of a trade on February 23, 2023, that sent Dmitry Orlov to Boston in exchange for this pick.
8. The Vegas Golden Knights' fifth-round pick went to the Arizona Coyotes as the result of a trade on February 22, 2023, that sent Dysin Mayo to Vegas in exchange for Shea Weber and this pick.

=== Round six ===
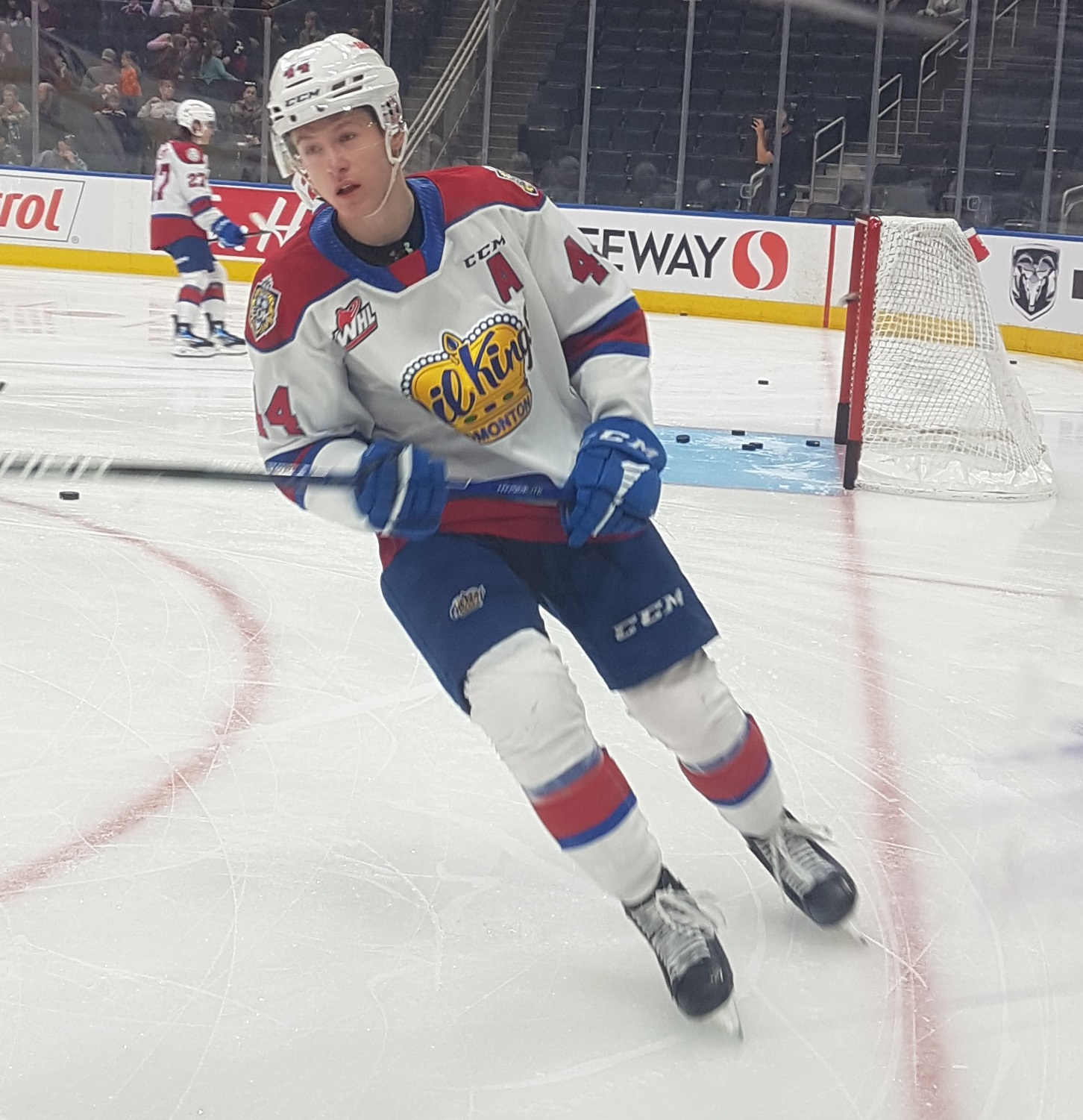
Vojtech Port was selected 161st overall by the Anaheim Ducks.

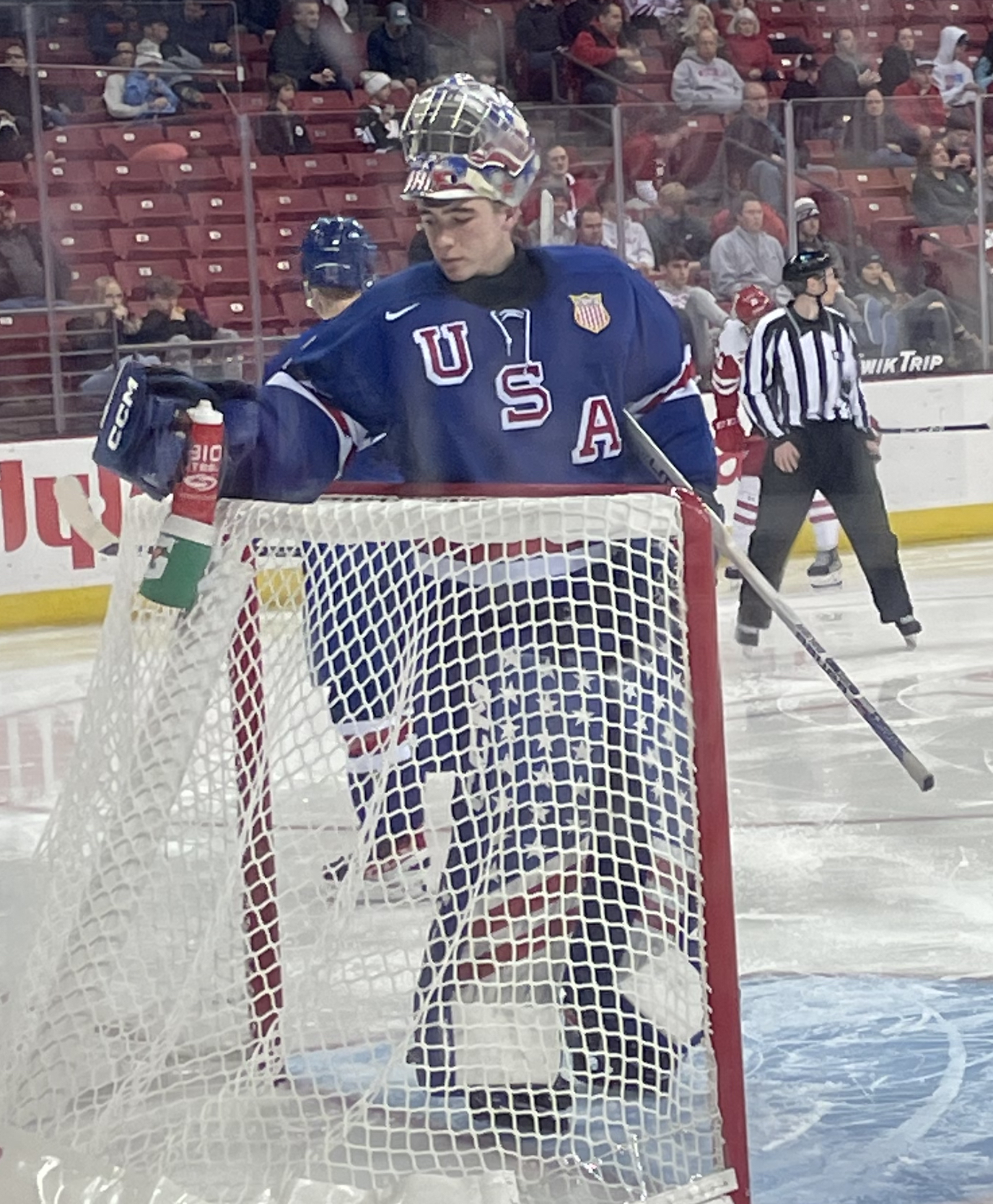
Carsen Musser was selected 116th overall by the Arizona Coyotes

Austin Roest was selected 175th overall by the Nashville Predators.

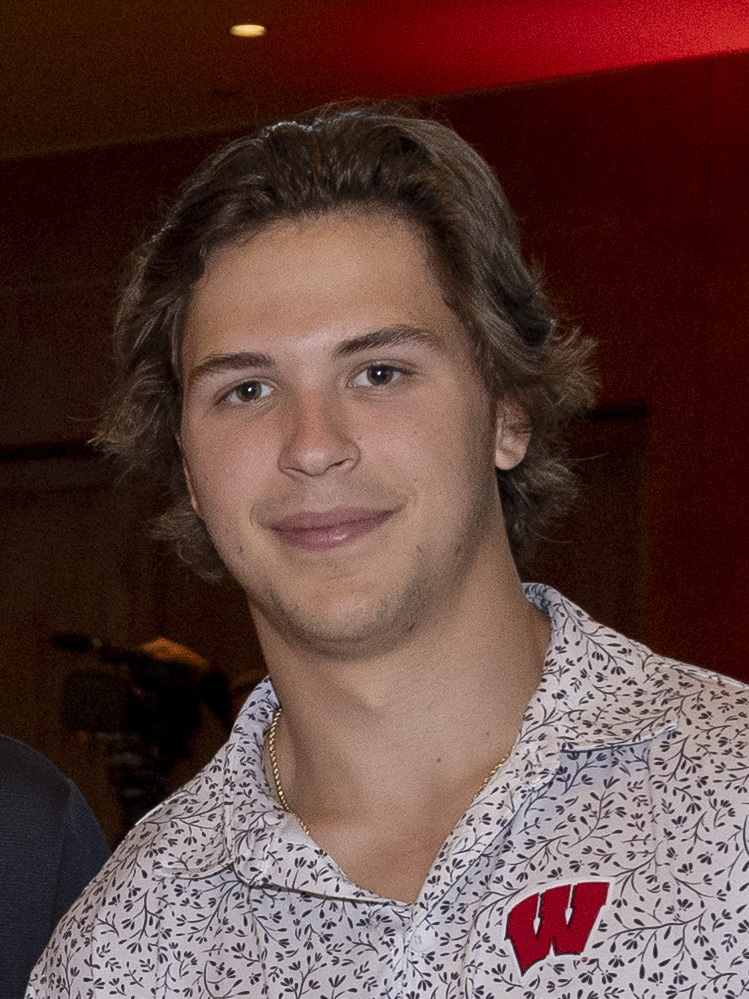
Zach Schulz was selected 177th overall by the New York Islanders.

#	Player	Nationality	NHL team	College/junior/club team
161	Vojtech Port (D)	Czech Republic	Anaheim Ducks	Edmonton Oil Kings (WHL)
162	Samu Bau (C)	Finland	Arizona Coyotes (from Columbus)^{1}	Ilves (Liiga)
163	Timur Mukhanov (LW)	Russia	Carolina Hurricanes (from Chicago)^{2}	Omskie Krylia (VHL)
164	Cole Brown (LW)	Canada	New Jersey Devils (from San Jose)^{3}	Hamilton Bulldogs (OHL)
165	Filip Eriksson (C)	Sweden	Montreal Canadiens	Vaxjo Lakers (J20 Nationell)
166	Carsen Musser (G)	United States	Arizona Coyotes	U.S. NTDP (USHL)
167	Milton Oscarson (C)	Sweden	Chicago Blackhawks (from Philadelphia)^{4}	Orebro HK (SHL)
168	Visa Vedenpaa (G)	Finland	Seattle Kraken (from Washington)^{5}	Oulun Karpat (U20 SM-sarja)
169	Rudy Guimond (G)	United States	Detroit Red Wings	Taft School Rhinos (USHS)
170	Matthew Mayich (D)	Canada	St. Louis Blues	Ottawa 67's (OHL)
171	Aiden Celebrini (D)	Canada	Vancouver Canucks	Brooks Bandits (AJHL)
172	Ryan MacPherson (C)	Canada	Philadelphia Flyers (from Ottawa)^{6}	Leamington Flyers (GOJHL)
173	Sean Keohane (D)	United States	Buffalo Sabres	Dexter Southfield School Shields (USHS)
174	Cooper Foster (C)	Canada	Pittsburgh Penguins	Ottawa 67's (OHL)
175	Austin Roest (C)	Canada	Nashville Predators	Everett Silvertips (WHL)
176	Yegor Yegorov (G)	Russia	Calgary Flames	MHC Dynamo Moscow (MHL)
177	Zach Schulz (D)	United States	New York Islanders	U.S. NTDP (USHL)
178	Dylan Roobroeck (C)	Canada	New York Rangers (from Winnipeg)^{7}	Oshawa Generals (OHL)
179	Warren Clark (D)	Canada	Tampa Bay Lightning	Steinbach Pistons (MJHL)
180	Zeb Forsfjall (C)	Sweden	Seattle Kraken	Skelleftea AIK (SHL)
181	Kalem Parker (D)	Canada	Minnesota Wild	Victoria Royals (WHL)
182	Ryan Conmy (RW)	United States	Los Angeles Kings	Sioux City Musketeers (USHL)
183	Ty Henricks (LW)	United States	New York Rangers	Fargo Force (USHL)
184	Nathaniel Day (G)	Canada	Edmonton Oilers	Flint Firebirds (OHL)
185	Noah Chadwick (D)	Canada	Toronto Maple Leafs	Lethbridge Hurricanes (WHL)
186	Danil Karpovich (D)	Belarus	New Jersey Devils	Avto Yekaterinburg (MHL)
187	Jeremy Hanzel (D)	Canada	Colorado Avalanche	Seattle Thunderbirds (WHL)
188	Ryan Walsh (C)	United States	Boston Bruins	Cedar Rapids RoughRiders (USHL)
189	Angus MacDonell (C)	Canada	Dallas Stars	Mississauga Steelheads (OHL)
190	Michael Emerson (RW)	United States	Carolina Hurricanes	Chicago Steel (USHL)
191	Luke Coughlin (D)	Canada	Florida Panthers	Rimouski Oceanic (QMJHL)
192	Tuomas Uronen (RW)	Finland	Vegas Golden Knights	HIFK (U20 SM-sarja)

Notes

1. The Columbus Blue Jackets' sixth-round pick went to the Arizona Coyotes as the result of a trade on March 2, 2023, that sent Jon Gillies to Columbus in exchange for Jakub Voracek and this pick.
2. The Chicago Blackhawks' sixth-round pick went to the Carolina Hurricanes as the result of a trade on July 8, 2022, that sent a sixth-round pick in 2022 to Chicago in exchange for this pick.
3. The San Jose Sharks' sixth-round pick went to the New Jersey Devils as the result of a trade on June 27, 2023, that sent Mackenzie Blackwood to San Jose in exchange for this pick.
4. The Philadelphia Flyers' sixth-round pick went to the Chicago Blackhawks as the result of a trade on June 29, 2023, that sent Tampa Bay's second-round pick in 2023 (51st overall) to Philadelphia in exchange for Los Angeles' second-round pick in 2024 and this pick.
5. The Washington Capitals' sixth-round pick went to the Seattle Kraken as the result of a trade on March 21, 2022, that sent Marcus Johansson to Washington in exchange for Daniel Sprong, a fourth-round pick in 2022 and this pick.
6. The Ottawa Senators' sixth-round pick went to the Philadelphia Flyers as the result of a trade on March 3, 2023, that sent Patrick Brown to Ottawa in exchange for this pick.
7. The Winnipeg Jets' sixth-round pick went to the New York Rangers as the result of a trade on March 21, 2022, that sent Morgan Barron, two conditional second-round picks in 2022 and a fifth-round pick in 2023 to Winnipeg in exchange for Andrew Copp and this pick.

=== Round seven ===
Luke Mittelstadt was selected 197th overall by the Montreal Canadiens.

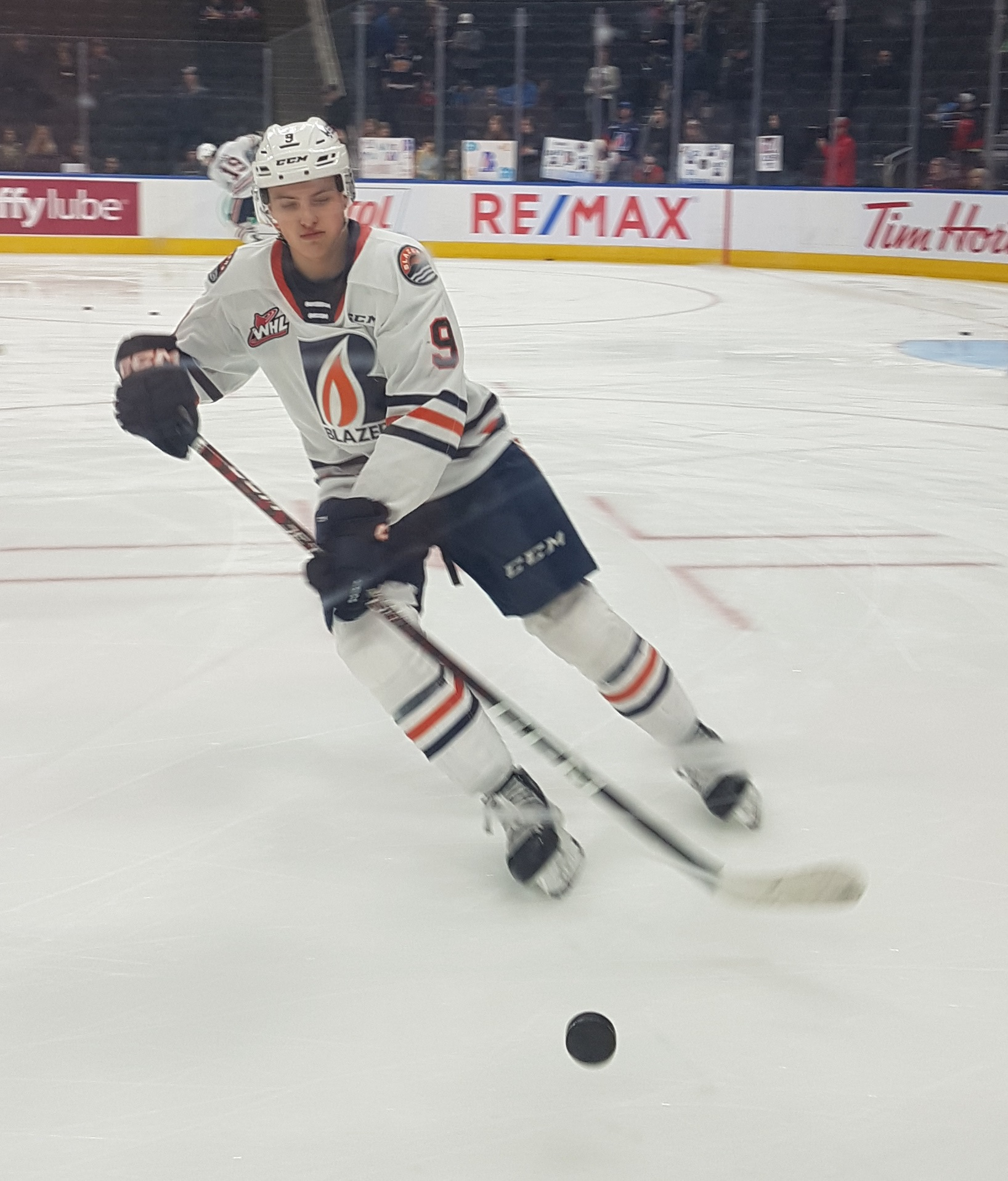
Emmitt Finnie was selected 201st overall by the Detroit Red Wings.

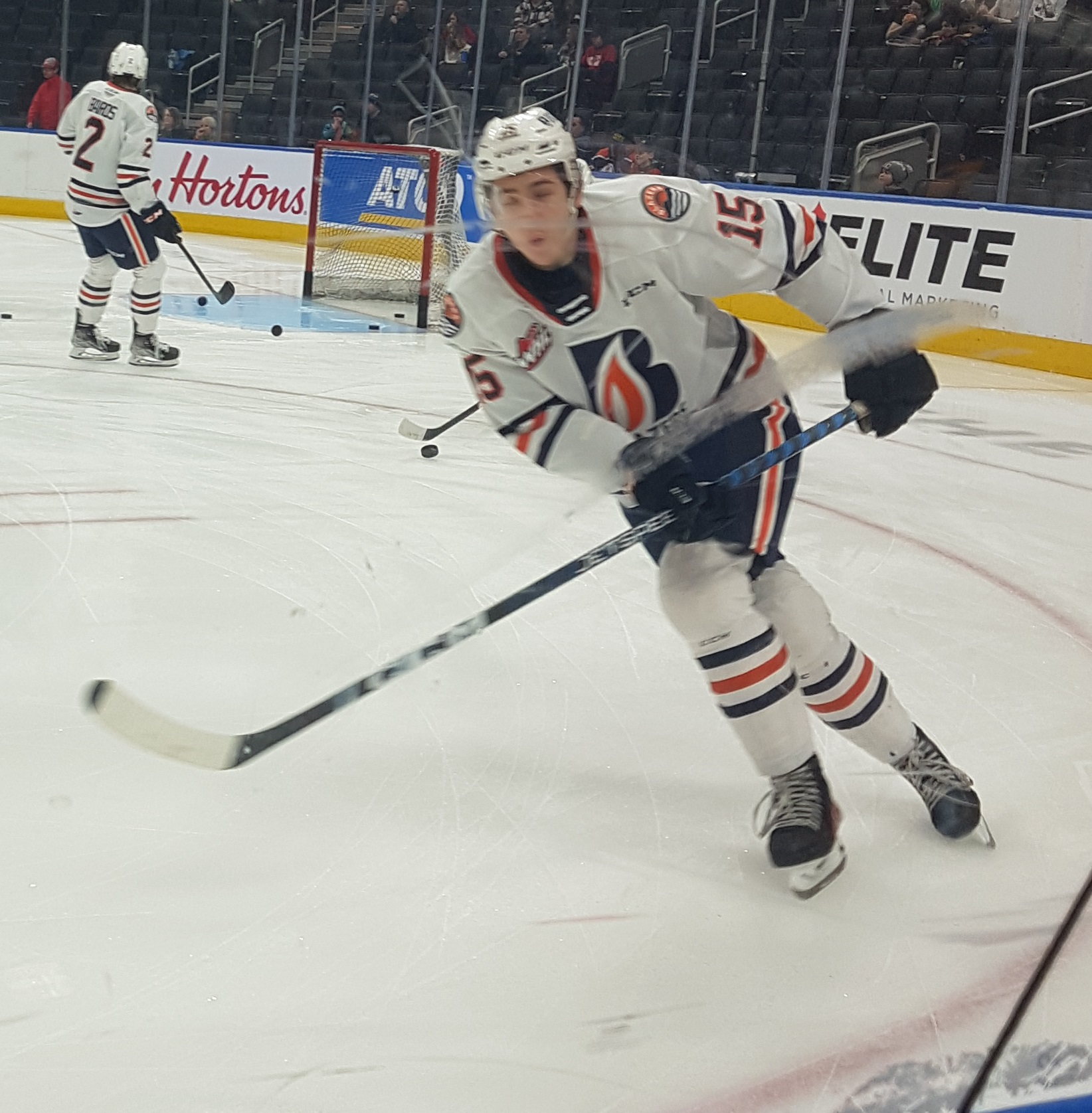
Connor Levis was selected 210th overall by the Winnipeg Jets.

James Clark was selected 213th overall by the Minnesota Wild.

Aiden Fink was selected 218th overall by the Nashville Predators.

#	Player	Nationality	NHL team	College/junior/club team
193	Jack Harvey (C)	United States	Tampa Bay Lightning (from Anaheim)^{1}	Chicago Steel (USHL)
194	Oiva Keskinen (C)	Finland	Columbus Blue Jackets	Tappara (U20 SM-sarja)
195	Janne Peltonen (D)	Finland	Chicago Blackhawks	Oulun Karpat (U20 SM-sarja)
196	David Klee (C)	United States	San Jose Sharks	Waterloo Black Hawks (USHL)
197	Luke Mittelstadt (D)	United States	Montreal Canadiens	Minnesota Golden Gophers (Big Ten)
198	Stepan Zvyagin (LW)	Russia	Florida Panthers (from Arizona)^{2}	Dinamo Minsk (KHL)
199	Matteo Mann (D)	Canada	Philadelphia Flyers	Chicoutimi Sagueneens (QMJHL)
200	Brett Hyland (C)	Canada	Washington Capitals	Brandon Wheat Kings (WHL)
201	Emmitt Finnie (C)	Canada	Detroit Red Wings	Kamloops Blazers (WHL)
202	Nikita Susuyev (RW)	Russia	St. Louis Blues	Khimik Voskresensk (VHL)
203	Yegor Rimashevskiy (RW)	Russia	San Jose Sharks (from Vancouver via Arizona)^{3}	MHC Dynamo Moscow (MHL)
204	Owen Beckner (C)	Canada	Ottawa Senators	Salmon Arm Silverbacks (BCHL)
205	Norwin Panocha (D)	Germany	Buffalo Sabres	Eisbaren Berlin (DEL)
206	Antoine Keller (G)	France	Washington Capitals (from Pittsburgh via San Jose)^{4}	Geneve-Servette (U20-Elit)
207	Vladimir Nikitin (G)	Kazakhstan	Ottawa Senators (from Nashville)^{5}	Barys Astana (Kazakhstan U20)
208	Axel Hurtig (D)	Sweden	Calgary Flames	Rogle BK (J20 Nationell)
209	Dennis Good Bogg (D)	Sweden	New York Islanders	AIK IF (J20 Nationell)
210	Connor Levis (RW)	Canada	Winnipeg Jets	Kamloops Blazers (WHL)
211	Ethan Hay (C)	Canada	Tampa Bay Lightning	Flint Firebirds (OHL)
212	Zaccharya Wisdom (RW)	Canada	Seattle Kraken	Cedar Rapids RoughRiders (USHL)
213	James Clark (LW)	United States	Minnesota Wild	Green Bay Gamblers (USHL)
214	Casper Nassen (RW)	Sweden	Boston Bruins (from Los Angeles)^{6}	Vasteras IK (J20 Nationell)
215	Nicholas Vantassell (RW)	United States	Ottawa Senators (from NY Rangers)^{7}	Green Bay Gamblers (USHL)
216	Matt Copponi (C)	United States	Edmonton Oilers	Merrimack Warriors (Hockey East)
217	Emil Jarventie (LW)	Finland	Pittsburgh Penguins (from Toronto)^{8}	Ilves (Liiga)
218	Aiden Fink (RW)	Canada	Nashville Predators (from New Jersey)^{9}	Brooks Bandits (AJHL)
219	Maros Jedlicka (C)	Slovakia	Colorado Avalanche	HKM Zvolen (Slovak Extraliga)
220	Kristian Kostadinski (D)	Sweden	Boston Bruins	Frolunda HC (J20 Nationell)
221	Sebastian Bradshaw (LW)	Canada	Dallas Stars	Elite Hockey Academy (18U AAA)
222	Yegor Velmakin (G)	Russia	Carolina Hurricanes	Buran Voronezh (VHL)
223	Kalle Kangas (D)	Finland	Pittsburgh Penguins (from Florida)^{10}	Jokerit (U20 SM-sarja)
224	Tyler Peddle (LW)	Canada	Columbus Blue Jackets (from Vegas)^{11}	Drummondville Voltigeurs (QMJHL)

Notes

1. The Anaheim Ducks' seventh-round pick went to the Tampa Bay Lightning as the result of a trade on March 24, 2021, that sent Alexander Volkov to Anaheim in exchange for Antoine Morand and this pick (being conditional at the time of the trade). The condition – Tampa Bay will receive a seventh-round pick in 2023 if the pick is available at the time of the selection – was converted when the pick became available after earlier conditional trades with Columbus and Edmonton were resolved on April 8, 2021.
2. The Arizona Coyotes' seventh-round pick went to the Florida Panthers as a result of a trade on July 26, 2021, that sent Anton Stralman, Vladislav Kolyachonok and second-round pick in 2024 to Arizona in exchange for this pick.
3. The Vancouver Canucks' seventh-round pick went to the San Jose Sharks as the result of a trade on July 8, 2022, that sent a seventh-round pick in 2022 to Arizona in exchange for this pick.
  Arizona previously acquired this pick as the result of a trade on July 23, 2021, that sent Oliver Ekman-Larsson and Conor Garland to Vancouver in exchange for Jay Beagle, Loui Eriksson, Antoine Roussel, a first-round pick in 2021, a second-round pick in 2022 and this pick.
4. The Pittsburgh Penguins' seventh-round pick went to the Washington Capitals as the result of a trade on June 29, 2023, that sent a seventh-round pick in 2025 to San Jose in exchange for this pick.
  San Jose previously acquired this pick as the result of a trade on March 3, 2023, that sent Tony Sund to Pittsburgh in exchange for a conditional fifth-round pick in 2024 and this pick.
5. The Nashville Predators' seventh-round pick went to the Ottawa Senators as a result of a trade on April 12, 2021, that sent Erik Gudbranson to Nashville in exchange for Brandon Fortunato and this pick.
6. The Los Angeles Kings' seventh-round pick went to the Boston Bruins as the result of a trade on July 8, 2022, that sent a seventh-round pick in 2022 to Los Angeles in exchange for this pick.
7. The New York Rangers' seventh-round pick went to the Ottawa Senators as the result of a trade on February 19, 2023, that sent Tyler Motte to New York in exchange for Julien Gauthier and this pick (being conditional at the time of the trade). The condition – Ottawa will receive a seventh-round pick in 2023 if the Rangers do not advance to the Second Round of the 2023 Stanley Cup playoffs – was converted on May 1, 2023.
8. The Toronto Maple Leafs' seventh-round pick went to the Pittsburgh Penguins as the result of a trade on July 17, 2021, that sent Jared McCann to Toronto in exchange for Filip Hallander and this pick.
9. The New Jersey Devils' seventh-round pick went to the Nashville Predators as the result of a trade on June 29, 2023, that sent a seventh-round pick in 2024 to New Jersey in exchange for this pick.
10. The Florida Panthers' seventh-round pick went to the Pittsburgh Penguins as the result of a trade on July 8, 2022, that sent a seventh-round pick in 2022 to Florida in exchange for this pick.
11. The Vegas Golden Knights' seventh-round pick went to the Columbus Blue Jackets as the result of a trade on June 29, 2023, that sent a seventh-round pick in 2024 to Vegas in exchange for this pick.

== Draftees based on nationality ==
Rank	Country	Selections	Percent	Top selection
	North America	136	60.7%	
1	Canada	86	38.3%	Connor Bedard, 1st
2	United States	50	22.3%	Will Smith, 4th
	Eurasia	88	39.3%	
3	Sweden	25	11.2%	Leo Carlsson, 2nd
4	Russia	20	8.9%	Dmitriy Simashev, 6th
5	Finland	15	6.7%	Kasper Halttunen, 36th
6	Slovakia	8	3.6%	Dalibor Dvorsky, 10th
7	Czech Republic	7	3.1%	Eduard Sale, 20th
8	Belarus	4	1.8%	Yegor Sidorov, 85th
9	Germany	3	1.3%	Kevin Bicker, 147th
10	Austria	1	0.4%	David Reinbacher, 5th
10	Denmark	1	0.4%	Oscar Fisker Molgaard, 52nd
10	Italy	1	0.4%	Damian Clara, 60th
10	Switzerland	1	0.4%	Rodwin Dionicio, 129th
10	France	1	0.4%	Antoine Keller, 206th
10	Kazakhstan	1	0.4%	Vladimir Nikitin, 207th

=== North American draftees by state/province ===
Rank	State/province	Selections	Percent	Top selection
1	Ontario	36	16.1%	Adam Fantilli, 3rd
2	British Columbia	19	8.5%	Connor Bedard, 1st
3	Minnesota	15	6.7%	Oliver Moore, 19th
4	Alberta	8	3.6%	Nate Danielson, 9th
4	Saskatchewan	8	3.6%	Brayden Yager, 14th
6	Quebec	7	3.1%	Ethan Gauthier, 37th
7	New York	6	2.7%	Quentin Musty, 26th
8	Illinois	5	2.2%	Gabe Perreault, 23rd
8	Michigan	5	2.2%	Trey Augustine, 41st
10	Massachusetts	4	1.8%	Will Smith, 4th
11	Manitoba	3	1.3%	Carson Bjarnason, 51st
11	New Brunswick	3	1.3%	Bradly Nadeau, 30th
11	New Jersey	3	1.3%	Christopher Pelosi, 92nd
14	Florida	2	0.9%	Gavin Brindley, 34th
14	Prince Edward Island	2	0.9%	Cam Squires, 122nd
14	California	2	0.9%	Sam Harris, 133rd
17	Wisconsin	1	0.4%	Brady Cleveland, 47th
17	Pennsylvania	1	0.4%	Brandon Svoboda, 71st
17	North Dakota	1	0.4%	Zach Nehring, 82nd
17	Arizona	1	0.4%	Jaden Lipinski, 112th
17	Ohio	1	0.4%	Matthew Mania, 150th
17	Virginia	1	0.4%	Ryan Conmy, 182nd
17	Colorado	1	0.4%	David Klee, 196th
17	Nova Scotia	1	0.4%	Tyler Peddle, 224th

== Broadcasting ==
In Canada, coverage of the draft was televised on Sportsnet and TVA Sports.

In the United States, coverage of the opening day of the draft was televised on ESPN and ESPN+. Coverage of the second day of the draft was televised on NHLN and ESPN+.

== See also ==
- 2020–21 NHL transactions
- 2021–22 NHL transactions
- 2022–23 NHL transactions
- 2023–24 NHL transactions
- 2023–24 NHL season
- List of first overall NHL draft picks
- List of NHL players
