= Brainware =

American software company that marketed Automatic identification and data capture

- Type: Private
- Industry: Software
- Founded: February 2006
- Defunct: 2017
- Fate: Acquired by Hyland Software
- Website: www.brainware.com

Brainware was an American software company that marketed Automatic identification and data capture and data extraction products. The company was acquired by Hyland Software in 2017. Brainware originally spun out of Dulles, Virginia-based SER Solutions Inc. in February 2006 when SER was acquired by The Gores Group LLC. From February 2006 to March 2012, Brainware's majority owner was San Francisco-based private equity firm Vista Equity Partners.

== History ==
On March 5, 2012, Lexmark International announced it had acquired the company for a cash price of approximately $148 million. The company was added to Lexmark's Perceptive Software division.

On July 10, 2017, Hyland Software finalized its acquisition of the Perceptive Business Unit of Lexmark International, Inc. All enterprise software business assets in the Perceptive business unit, including Perceptive Content (formerly ImageNow), Perceptive Intelligent Capture (formerly Brainware), Acuo VNA, PACSGEAR, Claron, Nolij, Saperion, Pallas Athena, ISYS and Twistage, now operate under Hyland's portfolio of products.

Brainware was headquartered in Ashburn, Virginia, USA, with sales, support, professional services and R&D offices in London, UK; Kirchzarten, Germany; and Neuchâtel, Switzerland. The company had partnerships with most major enterprise software providers, including Oracle, SAP and Microsoft, and said its software integrated with most available enterprise content management platforms. Brainware also partnered with a number of hardware providers, including Hewlett-Packard, Fujitsu and OPEX.

Brainware's core solution, Distiller, "disrupted the data capture industry by using contextual document data to deliver higher automated processing than earlier technology" said Henry Ijams, Managing Director and Founder, PayStream Advisors. Brainware was awarded a Technology Excellence Award by PayStream Advisors and their Advisory Board to honor those providers who are delivering industry leading solutions.

Brainware said its software "could relieve a company of 60 percent to 80 percent of the work of manually keying in information from unstructured documents," and serviced companies such as NEC, Mayo Clinic, Bechtel, Royal Dutch Shell, and Rabobank.

In a 2011 comparison report, Real Story Group classifies Brainware as a "Capture Solutions" vendor, competing directly with Kofax and ReadSoft.

Brainware and its customers were profiled in publications including Profit Online, Business Finance, imageSource, Managing Automation, Industryweek, Treasury & Risk and others. The company's enterprise search technology has been profiled by InfoWorld.

== See also ==
- Document processing
- Remittance advice
- Digital mailroom
- Automatic identification and data capture
