= Softpro =

SOFTPRO GmbH
- Type: acquired by Kofax plc - Sep 1, 2014
- Industry: Software
- Founded: December 1983
- Headquarters: Böblingen, Germany
- Area served: Worldwide
- Key people: Daniel Geiger, Christian Hefner, Martin Oberholzer, Bradford Weller ,
- Products: Software for capturing, maintaining and verification of handwritten signatures
- Number of employees: 70 (group worldwide) (2014-11-27)

The Softpro Group was a specialized vendor in the niche of systems for capture and verification of handwritten signatures – one segment of Biometrics.

Kofax plc acquired Softpro on September 1, 2014. A total of $34.7 million was paid in closing of the transaction. In the course of the takeover, SOFTPRO GmbH was dissolved and the register sheet (Amtsgericht Stuttgart file number HRB 241831) was closed. In May 2015, Kofax was in turn acquired by Lexmark.

The company is based in Böblingen, Germany with local subsidiaries in North America (Bear, Delaware), the United Kingdom (London), Asia-Pacific (Singapore, India (Chennai and Latin America (Chile). The group employs an international staff of 70 people.

== Products ==
Softpro has two major product segments: the "eSign Workflow" and "Fraud Prevention Solutions"

The "eSign Workflow" product line provides solutions for securing the authenticity and integrity of documents within electronic processes, such as those required for legal contracts. For this purpose, a unique signature technology is used to extract and evaluate both the static and dynamic (biometric) characteristics of handwritten signatures.

- Software Development Kit SignWare
- Document Security Software SignDoc
- Signature Capturing Device SignPad

"Fraud Prevention Solutions" allow to detect and prevent fraud in paper-based processes (such as payment transactions, in particular cheque fraud), as well as increasing operational efficiency using signature management and verification solutions.

- Signature Database SignBase
- Automatic Signature Verification SignCheck

== Company history ==
The company was founded in 1983 by Heinz Reschke. It initially developed individual software solutions for various industries. Visual comparison of signatures supported by PCs was started in 1987, triggered by growing demand from major financial institutions. Shortly afterwards the development of automatic signature verification started along with IBM's labs in nearby Schönaich and APP Informatik Davos from Switzerland. The automatic verification is based on a neural network and fuzzy logic. The first automatic verification went into production in 1994 at Credit Suisse. Intellectual property rights for the automatic signature verification were acquired from IBM in 1998.

In recent years SOFTPRO extended its product range through a check fraud prevention suite branded FraudOne and products to create electronic signatures based on the use and verification of dynamic (biometric) characteristics of signatures.
