= Alexander Hellnemo =

Swedish ice hockey player (born 2004)

- Born: 5 January 2004 (age 21); Böblingen, Germany
- Height: 6 ft 2 in (188 cm)
- Weight: 183 lb (83 kg; 13 st 1 lb)
- Position: Goaltender
- Catches: Left
- SHL team: Skellefteå AIK
- NHL draft: Undrafted
- Playing career: 2023–present

Alexander Hellnemo (born 5 January 2004) is a German-born Swedish professional ice hockey goaltender who currently plays for the Skellefteå AIK organization in the Swedish Hockey League (SHL).
