= ReadSoft =

Former developer of business process automation software

- Company type: Public (OMX Stockholm)
- Founded: Helsingborg, SWE (1991)
- Fate: Combined with Kofax and Perceptive Software to form Kofax (2017)
- Headquarters: Helsingborg, Sweden, SWE
- Key people: Göran E Larsson, Chairman; Jan Bertilsson, CFO
- Products: Applications for business process automation, on-premises, in the cloud, mobile, and hybrid
- Revenue: ▲SEK 663 million (2011)
- Net income: ▲SEK 74.5 million (2011)
- Number of employees: Over 600 (2014)
- Website: www.readsoft.com

ReadSoft was a global provider of applications for automating business processes. ReadSoft was founded by two university students in Linköping, Sweden, in 1991. The company was headquartered in Helsingborg, Sweden and its shares were traded on the NASDAQ OMX – Stockholm Small Cap list. ReadSoft had operations in 17 countries and a partner network in an additional 70 nations.

In July 2017, private equity and growth capital firm Thoma Bravo acquired and combined ReadSoft, Kofax, and Perceptive Software into an independent portfolio company named Kofax.

== Company operations ==
ReadSoft's specialties included accounts payable automation, accounts receivable automation, sales order processing, and digital mailrooms.

ReadSoft has been regarded as an "AP invoice specialist" – AP is a common abbreviation of Accounts Payable – by Gartner, an independent information technology research and advisory company. Specialist software is designed to integrate with the AP software from ERP systems, such as Oracle and SAP. For example, ERP integration may take advantage of single-sign-on processes, eliminating the need for employees to juggle multiple logons and systems.

With more than 12,000 customers, ReadSoft claimed to be the market leader of the Document Process Automation segment – a term first coined by ReadSoft itself to cover the technology that automates the processing of business documents. It involves data capture and extraction (optical character recognition) from paper and electronic documents, integration with company's existing ERP system and routing to company agents for approvals and problem resolution via workflow.

In 2006, ReadSoft merged with Ebydos AG from Frankfurt am Main, Germany a dedicated SAP Specialist Team that developed the Process Director, formerly known as Invoice Cockpit Suite. ReadSoft maintained other than SAP also Oracle competency/development centers which provided integrated solutions for companies with SAP and Oracle systems. Market analyst firm Harvey Spencer Associates reports ReadSoft with a 13% market share.

In May 2014, US Company Lexmark International, Inc announced a bid to buy out all remaining shares in ReadSoft. The deal was completed in late 2014, and ReadSoft then operated as part of Lexmark's Enterprise Software (formerly Perceptive Software) division.

In July 2017, Thoma Bravo acquired Lexmark's Enterprise Software business which consisted of three entities: Kofax, ReadSoft, and Perceptive Software. Following this, Kofax and ReadSoft were combined into a single, newly independent Thoma Bravo portfolio company named Kofax.
