= Wörwag Pharma =

German pharmaceutical company

Wörwag Pharma GmbH & Co. KG
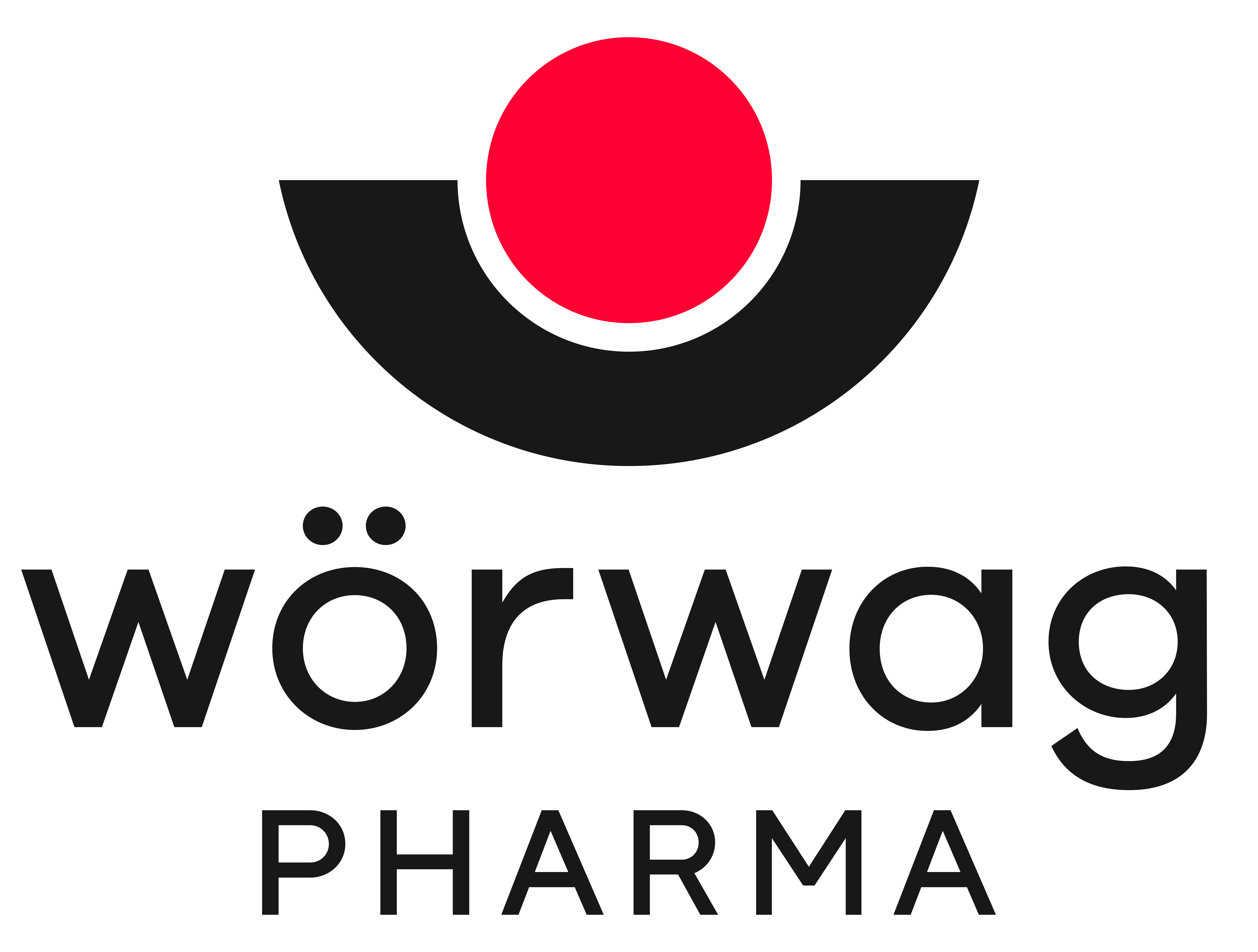
- Type: private (GmbH & Co. KG)
- Industry: Pharmaceutical industry
- Founded: 1971; 55 years ago in Stuttgart, Baden-Württemberg, Germany
- Founder: Fritz Wörwag
- Headquarters: Böblingen, Baden-Württemberg, Germany
- Area served: worldwide
- Key people: Gerhard Mayer; Jochen Schlindwein
- Products: Medicinal products
- Brands: Magnerot; Milgamma
- Revenue: ▲€358 million (2025)
- Owner: Wörwag family
- Number of employees: ▲1.500 (2025)
- Subsidiaries: AAA-Pharma GmbH
- Website: www.woerwagpharma.de/en/

Wörwag Pharma is a medium-sized family-owned pharmaceutical company headquartered in Böblingen, Germany with subsidiaries in Asia, Europe and South America. It was founded in 1971 by pharmacist Fritz Wörwag in Stuttgart. It sells prescription and over-the-counter preparations and food supplements.

Wörwag Pharma specializes in biofactors, which include vitamins, minerals, and trace elements.

== History ==
=== Foundation ===
The city pharmacy was founded in 1965 in Zuffenhausen, a district of Stuttgart. In the early 1970s, the owner Fritz Wörwag started producing and selling his own pharmaceutical products, which was the basis for the founding of Wörwag Pharma in the adjacent building of the pharmacy in 1971. The company's first micronutrient preparation was Magnerot Classic for the treatment of magnesium deficiency. To accelerate the development of the business, the company was converted into a corporation in 1977. In 1985, the product range was expanded to include the drug Milgamma with the active ingredient benfotiamine, a prodrug of vitamin B1.

=== Internationalization ===
After the fall of the Berlin Wall, Wörwag Pharma focused on the newly opened market in Eastern Germany and continued to expand in the direction of Eastern Europe. In 1993, a branch opened in Hungary – the first international site outside of Germany – and later, other branches in Bulgaria, Poland, Slovakia, Russia, and Central Asia were added. Wörwag Pharma focused its production on vitamins, trace elements and generic drugs. Since then, Wörwag Pharma has also been present in Asian and South American countries, for example, in Vietnam and Peru.

=== Further expansion ===
In 1996, Wörwag Pharma relocated its head office from Stuttgart to Böblingen. In 2001, the two children, Marcus Wörwag and Monika Wörwag, took over management of the company from their father. They continued the expansion course of Wörwag Pharma and concentrated primarily on biofactors. They spun off the generics business in 2015 into the independent subsidiary AAA-Pharma. In January 2019, Marcus Wörwag moved from the management to the advisory board, where he continues to shape the strategic direction of the group. In 2021, Monika Wörwag also withdrew from the management and has since been Director of Corporate Communications. In April 2021, Wörwag Pharma acquired the Polish company Sensilab, a contract manufacturing organization based in Konstantynów Łódzki, and thus came into possession of its first own production facility for pharmaceuticals. Since then, pharmaceuticals have been produced here for the company's own needs and in contract manufacturing under the new name Wörwag Pharma Operations.

== Products ==
Wörwag Pharma offers medicinal products in the four categories diabetic concomitant diseases, nervous system, immune system and musculoskeletal system. Wörwag Pharma refers to the products it sells as "biofactors". Overall, the company's product range includes 26 biofactor brands in Germany. Magnerot and Milgamma are still two significant brands in Wörwag Pharma's product range.

== Company structure ==
=== Legal form and organization ===
Wörwag Pharma GmbH & Co. KG is a limited partnership (Kommanditgesellschaft) according to German law. Its general partner is Dr. Fritz Wörwag GmbH, a limited liability company (Gesellschaft mit beschränkter Haftung), wholly owned by the entrepreneurial family. Besides, the founder and other family members are directly or indirectly involved as limited partners. The vast majority of liability contributions by the limited partners is apportioned to the family-owned Wörwag GmbH and Wörwag Pharma Beteiligung GmbH.

The annual financial statements of Wörwag Pharma GmbH & Co. KG is included in the consolidated financial statements of Wörwag Pharma Beteiligung GmbH. The latter holds equity interests in three further domestic and ten foreign subsidiaries. Wörwag Pharma International GmbH controls the international subsidiaries. In addition to Wörwag Pharma GmbH & Co. KG, which is the largest subsidiary, this includes Fibeg Immobilien GmbH, Generosan GmbH and Wörwag Pharma International GmbH, the latter two controlling the international holdings. In addition, the holding company has a 35% stake in AAA-Pharma GmbH, which markets generics.

=== Management ===
The management of Wörwag Pharma consists of Gerhard Mayer and Jochen Schlindwein. Mayer and Schlindwein are authorized signatories of Wörwag Pharma GmbH & Co. KG and at the same time are also directors of Dr. Fritz Wörwag GmbH.

=== Locations ===
On the Flugfeld, an inter-municipal residential area and industrial park between Böblingen and Sindelfingen, Wörwag Pharma moved into a new company building in 2021. The previous company headquarters were located in the Calwer Straße in Böblingen. In addition to the headquarters, there are more than 20 country offices, for instance in Almaty, Baku, Belgrade, Bratislava, Budapest, Chișinău, Cluj-Napoca, Ho Chi Minh City, Hong Kong, Kyiv, Lima, Ljubljana, Minsk, Moscow, Beijing, Riga, Sofia, Tashkent, Tbilisi, and Warsaw. These offices manage the business in about 35 countries. The company also has its own production facility in Konstantynów Łódzki, Poland (near Łódź).

== Fritz Wörwag Research Award ==
Since 1988, the company has been awarding the Fritz Wörwag Research Award, established by founder Fritz Wörwag and named after him, at irregular intervals. The award is endowed with 10,000 euros and recognizes research papers and well-founded reviews that make significant contributions to new experimental or clinical findings in the field of biofactors. The award winners are selected by an independent jury.

== Awards ==
- 2021: IHK honorary certificate
