= Böblingen Airport =

Former airport of Stuttgart, Baden-Württemberg, Germany (1915–1992)

Coordinates: 48°41′N 09°00′E

Böblingen Airport (German: Flughafen Böblingen) (IATA: PHM) was built in the mid-1920s for the city of Stuttgart, the capital of the German state of Baden-Württemberg. Bordered by Calwer Straße (K1073) and the E41, it lies northwest of Böblingen and south of the Daimler factory in Sindelfingen. An aircraft industry developed around this airfield, which was used by the Luftwaffe during the Second World War. On 1 September 1939 the airbase was the home station for the I/JG 52 (1st Group of Jagdgeschwader 52) which was flying the Messerschmitt Bf 109E-1 fighter aircraft. On that day its strength was 39 aircraft.

== Post-war history ==
After the Second World War, the airfield was transferred to United States Armed Forces, which used it as a maintenance facility and heliport until the mid-1990s. During this period, in the late 1960s and the early 1970s, its airfield was used to stage air shows.

In the 1950s and 1960s the airport was the home base of the Boeblingen FlugSport Gruppe. This group was very active in light general aviation and gliding.

The airfield has fallen into disrepair since the mid-1990s and many of its buildings were demolished once the armory was cleaned up. The old control tower, some hangars and some miscellaneous buildings still exist. New building projects are, however, being planned for the area and the airfield is now called Böblingen/Sindelfingen Airfield (German: Flugfeld Böblingen/Sindelfingen).

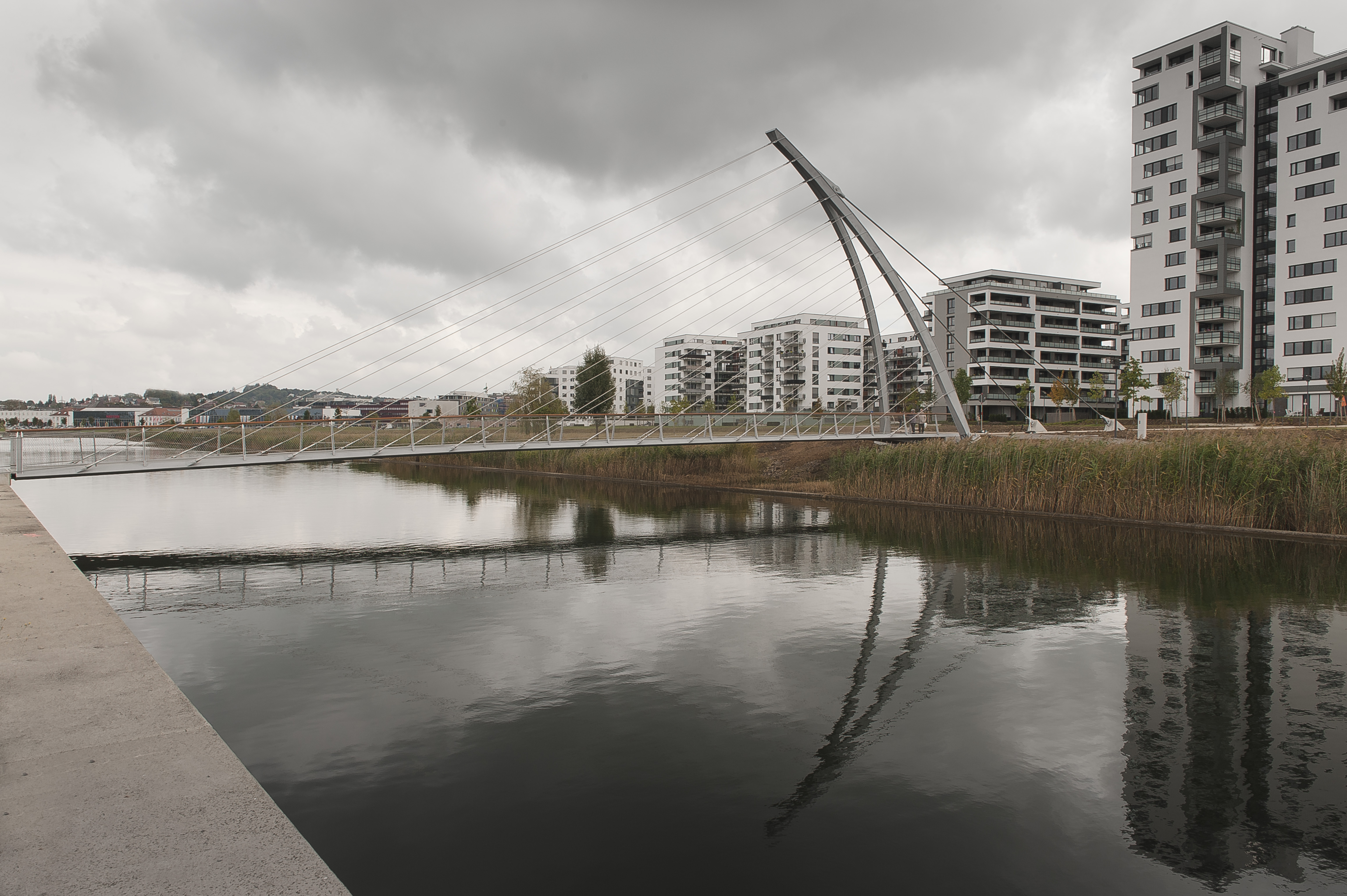
Residential buildings and "Harfenbrücke" (Harp Bridge) in the Flugfeld development area

In 2009 the old control tower was converted into a hotel, and the hangars are now part of Motorworld Stuttgart (formerly known as Meilenwerk Stuttgart), an automobile museum.
