= Remax World Expo =

Coordinates: 22.0205°N 113.3817°E

RemaxWorld Expo
- Status: Active
- Genre: Toner Cartridge; Remanufacturing; Exhibition; Printing
- Venue: Zhuhai International Convention & Exhibition Center
- Locations: Zhuhai, Guangdong
- Country: China
- Founded: 2007
- Founders: Tony Lee; Sabrina Lao
- Attendance: 13938 (2015)
- Organizer: CCPIT Zhuhai and Recycling Times Media Corporation
- Website: iRecyclingTimes.com

The RemaxWorld Expo is an annual trade show comprising vendors from within the print consumables industry. The event began in 2007, resulting from a joint venture between the China Council for the Promotion of International Trade (CCPIT) and Recycling Times Media Corporation (RT Media). Centered in Zhuhai (Guangdong, China), widely recognized as being the print consumables capital of the world, the exhibition currently takes place in the newly constructed Zhuhai International Convention & Exhibition Center. In 2015, the show accommodated 463 exhibitors and 13,938 visitors from 83 countries.

RemaxWorld Expo is the largest trade show for the print consumables industry, being a key exhibition of the Ministry of Commerce of the People's Republic of China.

== History ==
=== RemaxWorld Expo ===
Recycling Times (RT) Media Corporation was founded by Tony Lee and Sabrina Lao in 2006. After enlisting the services of industry veteran, David Gibbons, the company started running a small, three-day annual exhibition called the RemaxAsia Expo, which was held at the Zhuhai International Hotel. The event has grown year after year, with 5,000 attendees in 2008 and 8,626 in 2010, after having moved to the China International Aviation & Aerospace Exhibition Center.

Three years after its formation, RT Media became independent from its UK-based partner company. Subsequently, the event was temporarily renamed CIFEX. By 2011, the show had become the largest print consumables trade show in the world, and the first annual exhibition held at the Airshow Center in Zhuhai. Once again, attendance records were broken that year with 9,893 visitors searching for computer printing supplies.

Since 2013, RT Media holds the annual expo at the newly constructed Zhuhai International Convention & Exhibition Center, with more than 10,000 attendees’ year on year.

In 2015, RT Media acquired the USA based Recharger Magazine along with its World Expo which was run in Las Vegas for almost 30 years. Subsequently, the name changed again, combining the former Remax brand with the newly acquired World Expo brand. The exhibition was reborn as the RemaxWorld Expo to reflect its international audience.

=== Recycling Times Media ===
The Logo of Recycling Times Media

Recycling Times Media encourages discussion and engagement among and between the aftermarket and the OEM imaging sectors. Following the launch of its first event in 2007, the company commenced the publication of its monthly print consumables magazine in Chinese. It has since added monthly English and Spanish editions and a weekly TV broadcast. In 2012 it commenced co-operation with the Moscow-based agency, Business Inform to publish a quarterly edition of the magazine in the Russian language.

== Participating industries ==
=== Remanufactured toner cartridges ===
Cartridge remanufacturing is the process of refilling a used printer cartridge with new toner and replacing worn out component parts. The modern term also implies a refurbishment of the cartridge, with damaged parts having been replaced.

There are some risks associated with purchasing remanufactured toner cartridges. A poorly remanufactured ink cartridge may potentially leak, malfunction, or damage the printer. There are also prospective hazards as to whether the toner cartridge uses a generic toner, which may be less compatible with any given printer. The emergence of higher quality toner cartridges being remanufactured by the Aftermarket has spurred a reaction from the OEMs in two regards: legal and technical. Legally speaking, the protection of intellectual property rights has become an utmost priority, with lawsuits being filed by the Original Equipment Manufacturers (OEMs) for patent infringements. The development of more complex components, especially microchips, toner and OPC (drum) technologies have required the aftermarket to invest more in order to provide a consistent, quality alternative. The OEMs are, therefore, constantly in a bid to exceed the Aftermarket to ensure that the favorable products are their own.

Furthermore, many OEMs allege that the Aftermarket infringes their intellectual property through the remanufacture and sale of their empty cartridges. Various lawsuits, predominantly in the US and Europe, illustrate the contentious battle between these two sectors. On June 27, 2016, Hewlett-Packard filed a complaint to the United States International Trade Commission (USITC) regarding the patent infringement of print systems and components, namely printheads and ink cartridges.

=== Inkjet printers ===
Inkjet printing is a type of computer printing that recreates a digital image by propelling droplets of ink onto paper, plastic, or other substances. They are the most commonly used type of printer, and vary in terms of quality, size, and price.

Inkjet printing originated in the late 1950s, but was not marketed and sold until the 1980s. The four OEMs that account for the lion's share of inkjet printer sales are Canon, Hewlett-Packard (HP), Epson, and Lexmark. HP led the way, releasing the first HP Deskjet inkjet printer, priced at $1000 in 1988.

=== Products on display ===
Component parts, such as inks, toners, wiper blades and tools, were exhibited in the early years of the expo. The visitors were mainly remanufacturers looking for technical work around solutions, components and parts to use in the remanufacturing process. There were also many companies displaying their remanufactured, compatible supplies for sale to dealers, distributors, wholesalers and stationery stores.

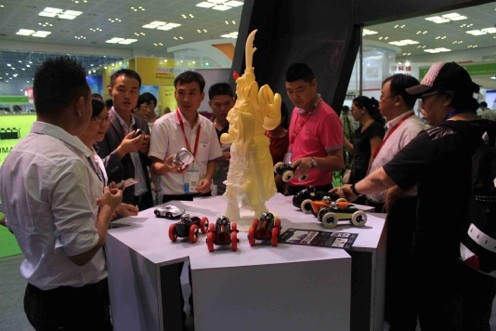
RemaxWorld visitors are fascinated with the development of 3D printed products on display

In 2010, due to the increasing cost and logistical difficulty in obtaining used, empty cartridges, also called cores, to remanufacture, some companies in China started to make new-built cartridges using injection molding technology to replicate the appearance and functions of the OEM products. This sector of the industry has expanded in China, with new-molded, finished products being manufactured more cheaply, in some cases, than it would cost to collect and refurbish a used, empty OEM manufactured cartridge.

Patent litigation between OEMs and Aftermarket manufacturers have led many in the Aftermarket to develop their own technologies and work around solutions to avoid costly lawsuits and loss of market share.

In recent years, there has been a shift towards the exhibition of finished goods, whether remanufactured or new-built. Many components and tools continue to be on show, including inks, toners, chips, Optical Photo Conductor (OPC) drums, magnetic rollers, and doctor blades; production and testing equipment; inkjet papers, copy papers, thermal transfer papers & other specialty papers; and printer & copier parts. Finished aftermarket goods are becoming more and more abundant at the show including ribbons, ink and toner cartridges.

An additional development is the increasing volume of service providers in technology, information services, software, IT systems, training, media and document solutions related to the printer consumables industry who attend the show.

=== 3D printing ===
3D technologies first became visible in the late 1980s, at which time they were called Rapid Prototyping (RP) technologies. The original commercial 3D system was introduced in 1987, and ever since, the market has been booming with 3D technologies, becoming one of the most lucrative printing industries.

The 3D sector of the exhibition is one of the newest and fastest growing sections of the show. iPrint 3D Expo was previously a separately held exhibition run by Recycling Times Media, Asia-Pacific 3D Printing Application Propelling Alliance, and CCPIT Zhuhai, which was wholly dedicated to showcasing 3D printing applications and was one of the first 3D printing expos in China. For the past three years, this exhibition has occupied its own 3000 meter squared venue, but will, henceforth, be held at the Zhuhai International Convention & Exhibition Center alongside the RemaxWorld Expo.

The 3D sector of the exhibition will focus on: industrial 3D printers, desktop 3D printers; 3D printer accessories; 3D scanning & software including scanners, laser engraving machines, and motion capture systems; materials & technology such as photosensitive resins, plastic power materials and metallic powder materials; and finally, 3D printing services.

== Zhuhai ==
=== World flagpoint for print consumables ===
In 2010, the China Computer Industry Association (CCIA) awarded the city of Zhuhai as the “Print Consumables Capital of the World”.

Tony Lee, (right) Print-Rite Founder, Arnald Ho, (left) and Vice Mayor of Zhuhai, Qingli Wang

Statistics show that 78.6% of ribbons in the world are manufactured in Zhuhai. Additionally, Zhuhai produces 68.4% of the aftermarket inkjet cartridges, and 40.1% of the aftermarket toner cartridges.

Within 50 kilometers of the center of Zhuhai, there are 680 print consumable manufacturers, and related marketing enterprises, which export products valued at over $7 billion annually to more than 100 countries across the world and employ more than 50,000 employees, accounting for one third of the employees within the global print consumables industry.

The main companies in the Zhuhai printing consumables industry are Seine Technology, Apex Microelectronics, Top Print Technology, Kolion Technology, Ninestar, MMC and Print-Rite (known as the “father of remanufactured print consumables in China.”. The completion of the Hong Kong-Zhuhai-Macao Bridge is expected to bolster Zhuhai's status as a manufacturing hub through enhancing integration with Hong Kong, Macao and greater Guangdong.

=== Governmental support ===
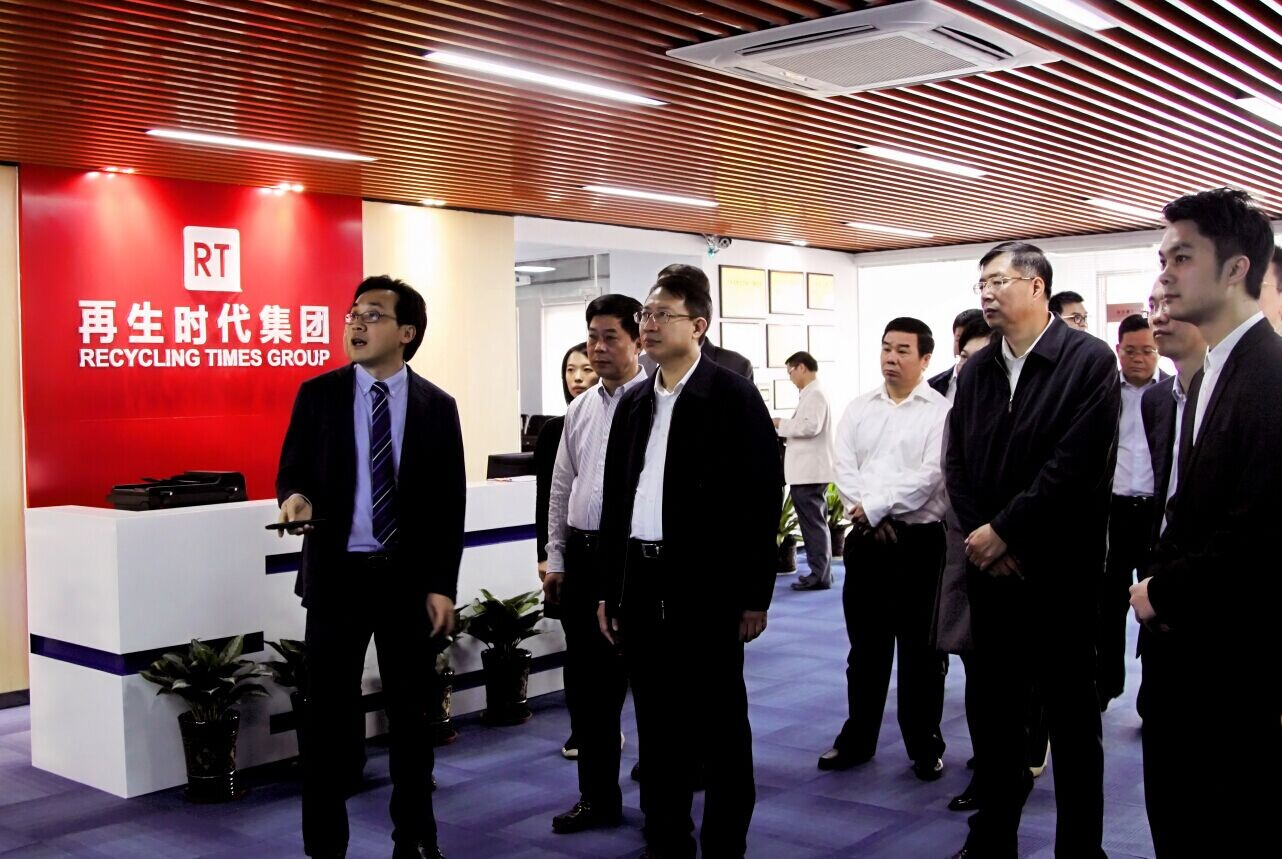
Founder Tony Lee (left) and Party Secretary of Zhuhai, Yangqiang Guo

RemaxWorld Expo is a joint undertaking between RT Media and the government run CCPIT. Chinese local and provincial government leaders provide much support and assistance to Chinese companies wishing to promote their products to foreign buyers and promote awareness of the Zhuhai industry.

There have been public service daises developed with the aim of providing amenities such as quality inspection, cross-border e-commerce, information inquiry and personnel training services for print consumable enterprises. These platforms consist of facilities such as the National Consumables Test Center, the National Key Laboratory Sub-Center, Guangdong Print Consumables Engineering Technological Research and Development Center, two Technical Enterprise Centers, and the First National Expert Enterprise Stations in China's consumables industry. Information service support also exists, comprising the print consumables working group of China National Standardization Technical Committee and the national print consumables database.

The National Consumables Test Center is the only national test center for printing and office consumables in China, undertaking supervision, snap checks, tests of toxic and hazardous products, several specialty tests, as well as entrusted inspection and arbitration inspection at home and abroad.

In 2015, with the attention and support of Zhuhai Bureau of Commerce, the specialty cluster of foreign print consumables industries within Zhuhai applied for the communal trademark “Zhuhai Print Consumables”. This has since been accepted by the Trademark Office of the State Administration for Industry & Commerce of the People's Republic of China.
