= Tevfik Altındağ =

German footballer

Tevfik Altindag
Personal information
- Date of birth: 26 October 1988 (age 38)
- Place of birth: Böblingen, West Germany
- Height: 1.80 m (5 ft 11 in)
- Position: Attacking midfielder

Team information
- Current team: Türkspor Neckarsulm
- Number: 20

Youth career
- 2002–2006: SV Böblingen
- 2006–2007: SSV Reutlingen

Senior career*
Years	Team	Apps	(Gls)
2007–2009	Ankaragücü	8	(1)
2009–2010	Sivasspor	1	(0)
2010	→ Kocaelispor (loan)	8	(0)
2010–2011	Eyüpspor	14	(0)
2011–2012	FSV Frankfurt II	11	(1)
2012–2013	Reutlingen 05	32	(10)
2013–2014	SGV Freiberg	29	(6)
2014–2018	Adanaspor	110	(10)
2018–2019	Altay	13	(0)
2019	Giresunspor	15	(1)
2019–2020	Adana Demirspor	18	(0)
2020–2021	Adanaspor	8	(2)
2021	Ankaraspor	8	(0)
2021–	Türkspor Neckarsulm		
- * Club domestic league appearances and goals as of 9 May 2021

Tevfik Altındağ (born 26 October 1988) is a German footballer who plays as a midfielder for the amateur side Türkspor Neckarsulm.

== Career ==
Born in Böblingen, West Germany, Altındağ began his career with SV Böblingen. He later joined the youth team of SSV Reutlingen and, in the summer of 2007, was scouted by Ankaragücü. On 10 November 2007 he made his debut for Ankaragücü against Gaziantepspor. He scored his only goal for the club on 30 March 2008 against Bursaspor.

After eight appearances and one goal during a one-and-a-half-year spell, he signed with Sivasspor on 14 January 2009. He made his debut on 7 February 2009 against Kocaelispor.
