= Lexmark =

American imaging company

Lexmark International, Inc.

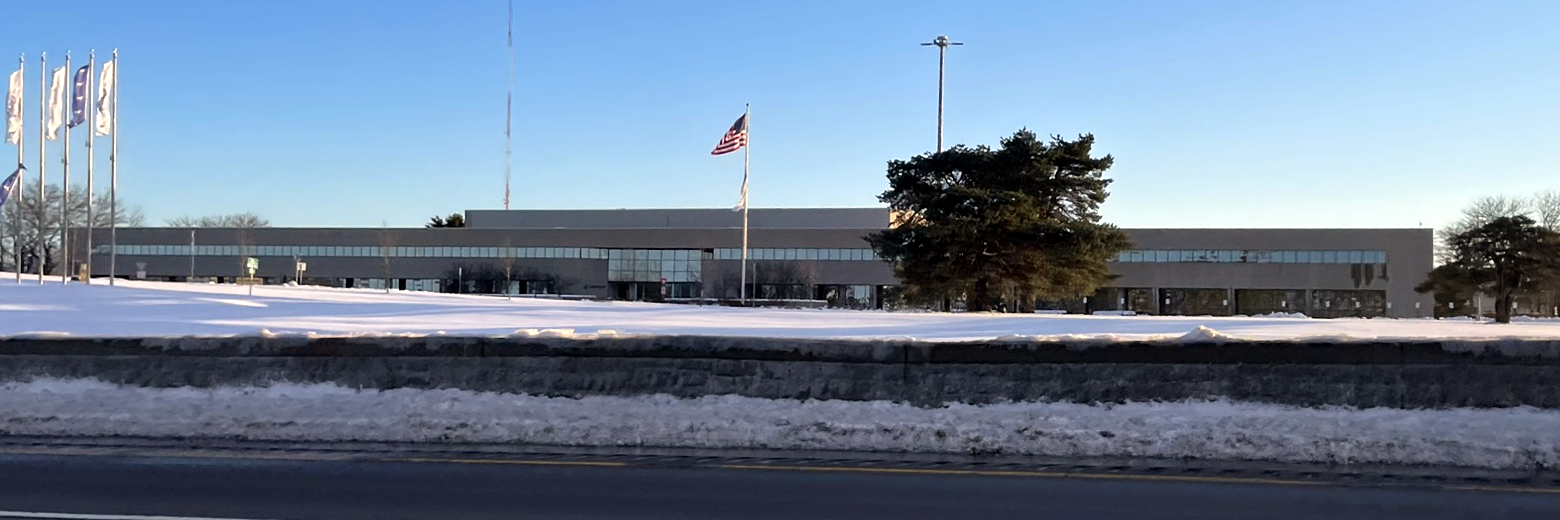
- Headquarters in Lexington, Kentucky, United States.
- Type: Private
- Traded as: NYSE: LXK (1995–2016)
- ISIN: US5297711070
- Industry: Computer industry
- Predecessor: IBM Information Products Corporation
- Founded: March 27, 1991; 35 years ago
- Founder: IBM
- Headquarters: Lexington, Kentucky, United States
- Area served: Worldwide
- Key people: Phillip Cassou (chairman); Allen Waugerman (president & CEO)
- Products: Business process management; Document management system; Enterprise Content Management; Managed Print Services; Enterprise output management; Printers; Toner
- Revenue: ▲US$3.711 billion (2014)
- Operating income: ▼US$149.2 million (2014)
- Net income: ▼US$79 million (2014)
- Total assets: ▲US$3.633 billion (2014)
- Total equity: ▼US$1.281 billion (2014)
- Number of employees: 13,000 (Nov 2025)
- Parent: Xerox
- Website: www.lexmark.com

Lexmark X738de, multifunction color laser printer

Lexmark International, Inc. is an American company that manufactures laser printers and imaging products. Founded in 1991, it is headquartered in Lexington, Kentucky.

From 2016 to 2025, the firm was controlled by a consortium formed by three multinational companies: Ninestar (formerly Apex Technology), PAG Asia Capital, and Legend Capital. On July 1, 2025, it was acquired in full by Xerox for US$1.5 billion.

== History ==
Lexmark was formed on March 27, 1991, when investment firm Clayton & Dubilier completed a leveraged buyout of IBM Information Products, the printer, typewriter, and keyboard operations of IBM.

On November 15, 1995, Lexmark became a publicly traded company on the New York Stock Exchange. By 2016, the firm struggled to keep corporate clients that are cutting costs and the consumers who are shifting to mobile devices from personal computers.

In April 2016, it was reported that Lexmark would be taken private by Apex Technology and PAG Asia Capital for US$3.6 billion, in a transaction that valued it at $40.50 per share. The first purchase discussions began at the Remax World Expo in 2015.

After closing the deal in November, the firm stated that it would maintain its headquarters in Lexington, and that its enterprise software line of business would be spun off and "rebranded" to Kofax. As part of the sale, the Perceptive business unit of Lexmark's Enterprise Software Services division was sold to the private equity firm Thoma Bravo (excluding non-Kofax branded document management products).

In addition to completing the aforementioned transaction, Thoma Bravo also agreed to sell the Perceptive business unit to Hyland Corporation. While Kofax-branded applications remained with Lexmark, other document management systems like Perceptive Content and NolijWeb and products like Intelligent Capture (formerly "Brainware") and Enterprise Search (formerly "ISYS") were absorbed by Hyland.

On December 23, 2024, the firm announced that Xerox would acquire it, in a deal expected to close in the second half of the following year. After the acquisition was completed in July 2025, Xerox COO John Bruno said that his company would continue to use the Lexmark name for an "undetermined amount of time" but ultimately plans to discontinue it, merging its product lines with Xerox's own.

== Operations ==
The firm has its corporate headquarters in Lexington, while also having R&D offices distributed globally and R&D facilities located in Longmont, Colorado, US; Lenexa, Kansas, US; Cebu, Philippines; Kolkata, India; Berlin, Germany; Stockholm, Sweden and Irvine, California, US.

With over 13,000 employees worldwide as of November 2025, the company has offices throughout North America and South America, Asia, Africa and Europe.

== Acquisitions ==
- May 2010: it acquired Perceptive Software for $280 million to build upon its software offerings. PS was a software firm that developed enterprise content management ("Perceptive Content", ″ImageNow") and document output management applications.
- 2011: Based in the Netherlands, Pallas Athena was acquired in a transaction valued at approximately US$50.2 million, adding business process management software, document output management, and process mining capabilities to Lexmark's services.
- March 2012: Acquisition of Luxembourg-based BDGB Enterprise, including its subsidiary Brainware, for US$148 million. Brainware's intelligent data capture platform extracted critical information from paper and electronic documents, validated the extracted data, and passed it on to clients' data management systems, enterprise resource planning (ERP), and/or financial management systems.
- March 2012: it acquired Australia-based ISYS Search Software and U.S.-based Nolij Corporation, both for $32 million. ISYS built enterprise search solutions and Nolij developed Web-based document imaging and workflow software.
- January 2013: acquisition of Acuo Technologies, a Minnesota-based developer of medical imaging document management software, for $45 million.
- March 2013: acquisition of AccessVia and Twistage for approximately $31.5 million.
- August 2013: agreement signed to acquire Saperion AG, a German developer and provider of enterprise content management and business process management (BPM) software in Europe, for $72 million.
- October 2013: acquisition of PACSGEAR for approximately $54 million.
- September 2014: acquisition of ReadSoft, a Stockholm-based provider of applications for automating business processes, for $251 million.
- May 2015: it announced the $1 billion acquisition of Kofax, an Irvine, California-based provider of smart process applications. They combined capture, process management, analytics and mobile capabilities to organizations. This line of business was, in turn, spun off from Lexmark when it was acquired by Apex Technology in November 2016.

== Divestitures ==
=== 1996: Keyboard factory ===
In 1996, Lexmark International was prepared to shut their Lexington keyboard factory where they produced Model M buckling-spring keyboards. Despite being the original designer, patent holder, and main customer, IBM decided to remove the Model M from its product line in favor of cheaper Asian-made rubber-dome keyboards.

In an attempt to prevent its production from ceasing, a group of former IBM and Lexmark employees acquired the factory located in Lexington. In April of that year, the business was re-established as Unicomp, making its own modernized versions of the Model M keyboards.

=== 2012–13: Inkjet printer line ===
In August 2012, Lexmark announced that it would stop production of its inkjet printer line. In April 2013, Funai Electric Company, Ltd. announced that it had signed an agreement to acquire Lexmark's inkjet technology and assets for approximately $100 million (approximately ¥9.5 billion).

Funai acquired more than 1,500 inkjet patents, Lexmark's inkjet-related research and development assets and tools, all outstanding shares and the manufacturing facility of Lexmark International (Philippines), Inc., and other inkjet-related technologies and assets.

== Legal cases ==
Lexmark pioneered the use of profits from ink cartridges as a business model, with the result of modifying the legal models of product ownership and patent exhaustion over several years.

Arizona Cartridge Remanufacturers Ass'n Inc. v. Lexmark International Inc., also referred to as ACRA v. Lexmark, was a 2005 decision by the United States Court of Appeals for the Ninth Circuit, which ruled that an End User License Agreement on a physical box can be binding on consumers who signal their acceptance of the agreement simply by opening the box. The decision holds that Lexmark can enforce the "single use only" policy written on the side of Lexmark printer cartridge boxes sold to large customers at a discount, with the understanding that the customers will return the cartridges to Lexmark after using them (so that the cartridges would not be diverted, refilled, and then resold), or else face legal liability for not returning them to the company as agreed.

Lexmark had introduced various authentication mechanisms into its printers that rejected third-party cartridges and resisted any attempt to refill spent ones. ACRA, a consumer group representing manufacturers of third-party authentication microchips and third-party ink and toner cartridges, had challenged this policy as deceptive and unenforceable. The Ninth Circuit disagreed, allowing Lexmark to prevent the use of third-party cartridges and the re-use of empty ones. These restrictions are achieved with a combination of encryption hardware within the cartridges and printer firmware that attempts to verify their authenticity as being first-party (i.e. manufactured or distributed by Lexmark). The firmware tracks cartridge ink levels, and will permanently disable any cartridge that it has determined to have been refilled, regardless of whether it actually has been.

Subsequent challenges to the "single use only" policy were more successful. Lexmark lost the Supreme Court case Impression Products, Inc. v. Lexmark International, Inc., in a 7–1 ruling that partially reversed and remanded the Ninth Circuit decision in ACRA v. Lexmark on May 30, 2017:

When a patentee chooses to sell an item, that product is no longer within the limits of the monopoly and instead becomes the private, individual property of the purchaser, with the rights and benefits that come along with ownership. A patentee is free to set the price and negotiate contracts with purchasers, but may not, by virtue of his patent, control the use or disposition of the product after ownership passes to the purchaser. The sale terminates all patent rights to that item.

The decision holds that Lexmark cannot sue third-party manufacturers or resellers for patent infringement; notably, it does not mean that Lexmark cannot use firmware to detect, reject or disable third-party ink cartridges or attempted refills. As of 2024, the company continues to do so.

In 2023, Ninestar, a majority owner of Lexmark at the time, was banned from importing goods into the United States under the Uyghur Forced Labor Prevention Act. While Lexmark claimed its investors had no operational control over Ninestar, it did not respond to whether Lexmark sourced hardware from Ninestar.

== Logos ==
1991–2015

2015–2025

2025–present
