= OPEX (corporation) =

Manufacturing company in New Jersey

OPEX Corporation
- Company type: Private
- Industry: Warehouse Automation, Document imaging, Mail Processing
- Founded: 1973
- Headquarters: Moorestown Township, New Jersey United States
- Key people: Dave Stevens, President & CEO
- Products: warehouse automation, mail processing equipment, high-speed scanners, mail sorting machines
- Revenue: Undisclosed
- Number of employees: ~1600 (Jan 2023)
- Website: opex.com

OPEX Corporation is a manufacturing company based in Moorestown, New Jersey. They primarily manufacture warehouse automation equipment, high volume mailroom automation equipment, document scanners, and remittance processors. Their warehouse automation products have been implemented at retail and e-commerce companies such as: HBC, BOXED, and iHerb

OPEX employs approximately ~1600 people throughout the world with locations in Moorestown Township, New Jersey USA, Plano, Texas, Bolton, England, Villebon Sur Yvette, France, and Duisburg, Germany.
