= Perceptive Software =

- Industry: Enterprise Content Management, Document Management,
- Founded: Shawnee, Kansas (1988)
- Headquarters: Lenexa, Kansas
- Number of locations: Australia, Belgium, France, Germany, Italy, Netherlands, Singapore, Spain, Switzerland, United Arab Emirates, and United Kingdom
- Area served: Worldwide
- Key people: Scott Coons (President and CEO)
- Number of employees: 900+ worldwide
- Website: www.hyland.com/en/welcome

Perceptive Software (formerly Genesis Software) was an American software company based in Kansas. It was acquired and made a business unit of Hyland Software, Inc, in July 2017.

== History ==
The company was founded in 1988 as Genesis Software and initially produced accounts payable software applications. The name changed to Perceptive Vision in 1995, when the company's focus shifted to document management, imaging and workflow and its flagship product, ImageNow. The company became Perceptive Software in 2004 and was acquired by Lexmark International in 2010 for $280 million.

In 2011, Lexmark purchased the Netherlands-based Pallas Athena in a cash transaction valued at approximately $50.2 million. The Dutch company became part of Perceptive Software.

In 2012, Perceptive Software was one of the top 10 providers of ECM software technology in the world.

In March 2012, Lexmark International acquired Australia-based ISYS Search Software for $32 million and U.S.-based Nolij Corporation for $32 million. Nolij develops web-based document imaging and workflow software.

In January 2013, Lexmark acquired Minnesota-based Acuo Technologies for $45 million. Acuo Technologies develops medical imaging document management software.

In March 2013, Lexmark announced acquisitions of AccessVia and Twistage for a combined purchase price of approximately $31.5 million.

In late August 2013, Lexmark signed an agreement to acquire Germany-based Saperion AG, a leading developer and provider of enterprise content management (ECM) and business process management (BPM) software in Europe, for a cash purchase price of approximately $72 million.

In early October 2013, Lexmark acquired PACSGEAR for a cash purchase price of approximately $54 million. PACSGEAR will report into Perceptive Software.

In November 2014, Lexmark acquired the Swedish company ReadSoft.

In March 2015, Lexmark announced an agreement to acquire (technically merge with) Kofax Limited for approximately $1 billion (US). Kofax and Perceptive will constitute a Lexmark Enterprise Software unit, but specific organizational details have not been announced.

In May 2017, Lexmark entered into a definitive agreement to sell the Perceptive business unit to Hyland Software.

On July 10, 2017, Hyland finalized its acquisition of the Perceptive Business Unit of Lexmark International, Inc. All enterprise software business assets in the Perceptive business unit, including Perceptive Content (formerly ImageNow), Perceptive Intelligent Capture (formerly Brainware), Acuo VNA, PACSGEAR, Claron, Nolij, Saperion, Pallas Athena, ISYS and Twistage, will now operate under Hyland’s portfolio of products.

== Products ==
The product focus for Perceptive Software is enterprise content management (ECM), business process management (BPM), and document output management (DOM) software technology and applications. Core components of this software are document and records management, document imaging, enterprise information management, eForms, and records and information management (RIM).

The company’s business applications automate back office processes such as accounting and financials, human resources, contract management, payroll, legal and compliance. Key industries currently using Perceptive Software’s ECM applications include higher education, customer service, healthcare, government, and financial services.

== Awards ==
Perceptive Software has been named a Computerworld Honors Laureate, and president and CEO Scott Coons has received the Ernst & Young Entrepreneur of the Year award. The Kansas City Business Journal honored Perceptive Software with its "Hall of Champions" award in 2010.

Employees voted it one of Kansas City's "Best Places to Work" in 2004, 2005, 2006, and 2007. Additionally, the Kansas City Business Journal named Perceptive Software a Champion of Business in 2010.

== Trivia ==
The company's previous global headquarters located in Shawnee, Kansas, included a slide between the second and first floors and a regulation dodgeball court.

In 2006, the company hosted its first Dodge for a Cause charity dodgeball tournament to benefit the Juvenile Diabetes Research Foundation (JDRF). The charity tournament became an annual event, raising more than $160,000 for JDRF over 10 years' time.
