= Tungsten Automation =

American intelligent automation software provider

- Formerly: Kofax Inc.
- Type: Private
- Industry: Computer software
- Founded: 1985; 41 years ago
- Founders: David Silver, Dean Hough
- Headquarters: Denver, Colorado
- Key people: Peter Hantman (CEO)
- Products: Intelligent automation, cognitive capture, robotic process automation, business process orchestration, data integration, customer communications management, analytics, print management
- Revenue: ▲$500 million (2020)
- Owner: Clearlake Capital; TA Associates
- Number of employees: 2,200 (2024)
- Website: www.tungstenautomation.com

Tungsten Automation, formerly Kofax Inc., is a Denver, Colorado-based intelligent automation software provider. Founded in 1985, the company's software allows businesses to automate the handling of data and documents.

From 2017 to 2022, the company was an independent portfolio company owned by private equity firm Thoma Bravo. In 2022, Clearlake Capital and TA Associates completed their acquisition of the company.

== History ==
Tungsten Automation was founded in 1985 as Kofax Image Products by engineers Dean Hough and David Silver, who worked together at document processing company FileNet. Silver became the company's chief executive officer and president. The company initially focused on making personal computer circuit boards to convert them into image-processing machines, and its first products were released in 1989.

In the 1990s, the company continued to develop its core image processing technology.

In October 1997, the company went public on the Nasdaq market.

In July 1999, the company announced it would be purchased by UK-based holding company DICOM Group in a reported US$75 million cash deal, with the intent to pair Kofax Image Products, Inc.’s digital capture technology with DICOM Group's distribution services in Europe.

In July 2000, CEO and President Silver stepped down and was succeeded by Arnold von Büren, former deputy chief executive officer of Dicom.

In 2002, Rick Murphy was named CEO of Kofax, and von Büren was promoted to CEO of Dicom Group.

In December 2005, Dicom Group / Kofax Inc. appointed Rob Klatell as CEO of Dicom.

In November 2007, then CEO Rob Klatell was replaced by Reynolds Bish, former CEO of Captiva Software, now part of OpenText.

In January 2008, the company renamed Kofax Image Products, Inc. and Dicom Group as Kofax Inc.

In December, Kofax Inc. was added to the Nasdaq Stock Market as (KFX).

In March 2015, the company introduced Mobile ID, image validation software for capturing proof-of-identity documents required for secure processes such as opening bank accounts.

On March 24, 2015, Lexmark International, Inc. and Kofax Inc. entered into a merger agreement. Lexmark acquired outstanding shares of Kofax Inc. for US$11 per share, or approximately US$1 billion. After the acquisition closed, Kofax Inc. combined with Perceptive Software, a subsidiary of Lexmark, to form an expanded business content and management software unit of their parent company. Kofax Inc. ended the 2015 fiscal year with US$297 million in revenue.

In the spring of 2016, Lexmark and its subsidiaries were acquired by an investment consortium led by Apex Technology Co. and PAG Asia Capital. The purchase was valued at US$3.6 billion.

In July 2017, private equity and growth capital firm Thoma Bravo acquired Lexmark's Enterprise Software business which consisted of three entities: Kofax, ReadSoft, and Perceptive Software. Following this, Kofax and ReadSoft combined into a single, newly independent Thoma Bravo portfolio company.

In July 2022, Clearlake Capital and TA Associates completed their acquisition of the company from Thoma Bravo.

On January 16, 2024, Kofax was renamed to Tungsten Automation.

On July 1, 2025, Peter Hantman was appointed CEO.

== Acquisitions ==
In April 2003, Kofax acquired Mohomine Inc., an automated text classification and extraction developer.

In May 2011, Kofax Inc. announced the acquisition of Atalasoft Inc., an image software company whose primary product was a document imaging toolkit named dotImage. In December, Kofax Inc.’s US$48 million bid to purchase London IT company Singularity was accepted. This acquisition enabled business process management (BPM) and case management software to exist through public or private SaaS (software as a service) platforms.

In the summer of 2013, Kofax added robotic process automation (RPA) developer Kapow Software (now: Kofax RPA).

In September 2014, Kofax acquired Softpro, an e-signature and signature verification software company in Stuttgart, Germany, as a separate entity.

In March 2015, Kofax Inc. purchased Aia Holding, a customer communications management company in The Netherlands, in a US$19.5 million cash deal.

In November 2018, Kofax announced it was acquiring the Document Imaging Division of Nuance Communications. By means of this acquisition, Kofax gained Nuance's Power PDF, PaperPort document management and OmniPage optical character recognition software applications.

In May 2019, Kofax acquired Top Image Systems (NASDAQ:TISA)(TIS).

In June 2021, Kofax announced the acquisition of PSIGEN Software, Inc. In August, the company announced the acquisition of cloud-based print management system provider Printix.net.

In June 2022, Kofax completed its acquisition of Tungsten Corporation.

In August 2022, Kofax completed the acquisition of Ephesoft Inc.
