= Böblingen =

- Town
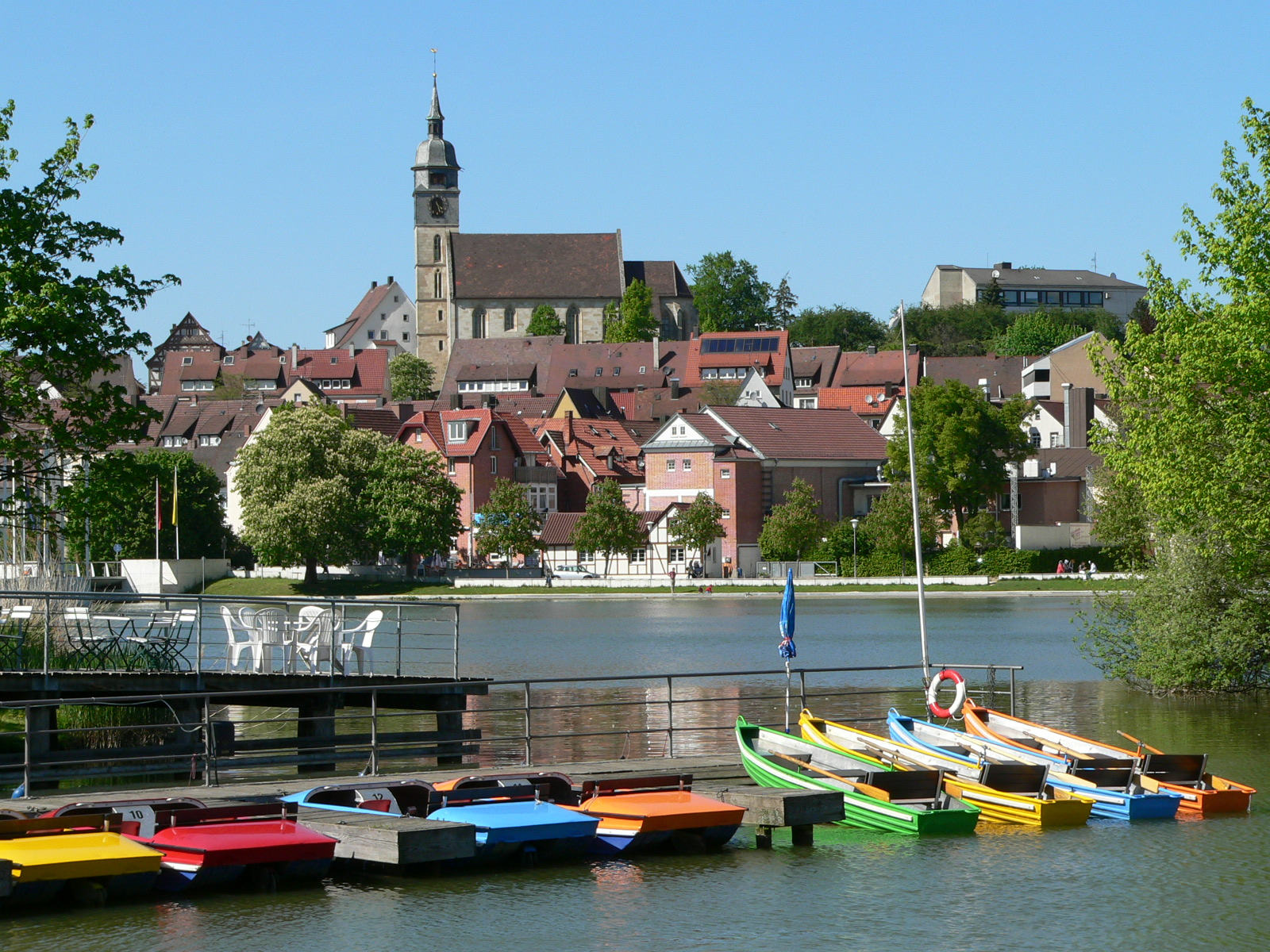
- View of the town

- Coat of arms

- Location of Böblingen within Böblingen district
- Interactive map of Böblingen
- Location within Germany Location within Baden-Württemberg
- Coordinates: 48°41′08″N 09°00′55″E
- Country: Germany
- State: Baden-Württemberg
- Admin. region: Stuttgart
- District: Böblingen

Government
  - Mayor (2018–26): Stefan Belz (Greens)

Area
  - Total: 39.04 km^{2} (15.07 sq mi)
- Elevation: 464 m (1,522 ft)

Population (2025-12-31)
  - Total: 51,204
  - Density: 1,312/km^{2} (3,397/sq mi)
- Time zone: UTC+01:00 (CET)
  - Summer (DST): UTC+02:00 (CEST)
- Postal codes: 71032, 71034
- Dialling codes: 07031
- Vehicle registration: BB, LEO
- Website: www.boeblingen.eu

Böblingen (German pronunciation: [ˈbøːblɪŋən]; Swabian: Beblenga) is a town in Baden-Württemberg, Germany, seat of Böblingen District. Sindelfingen and Böblingen are contiguous.

== History ==
Böblingen was founded by Count Wilhelm von Tübingen-Böblingen in 1253. Württemberg acquired the town in 1357, and on 12 May 1525 one of the bloodiest battles of the German Peasants' War took place in Böblingen. Jörg Truchsess von Waldburg attacked a force of 15,000 armed peasants; 3,000 were killed. By the end of the Thirty Years' War in 1648, the population of Böblingen had been reduced to 600.

After the establishment of the Kingdom of Württemberg, Böblingen became the seat of an Oberamt (administrative unit) in 1818. The town was connected to the railroad network in 1879, allowing industrialization to take place. In the context of administrative reform in 1938, Böblingen Oberamt became Böblingen Landkreis (district).

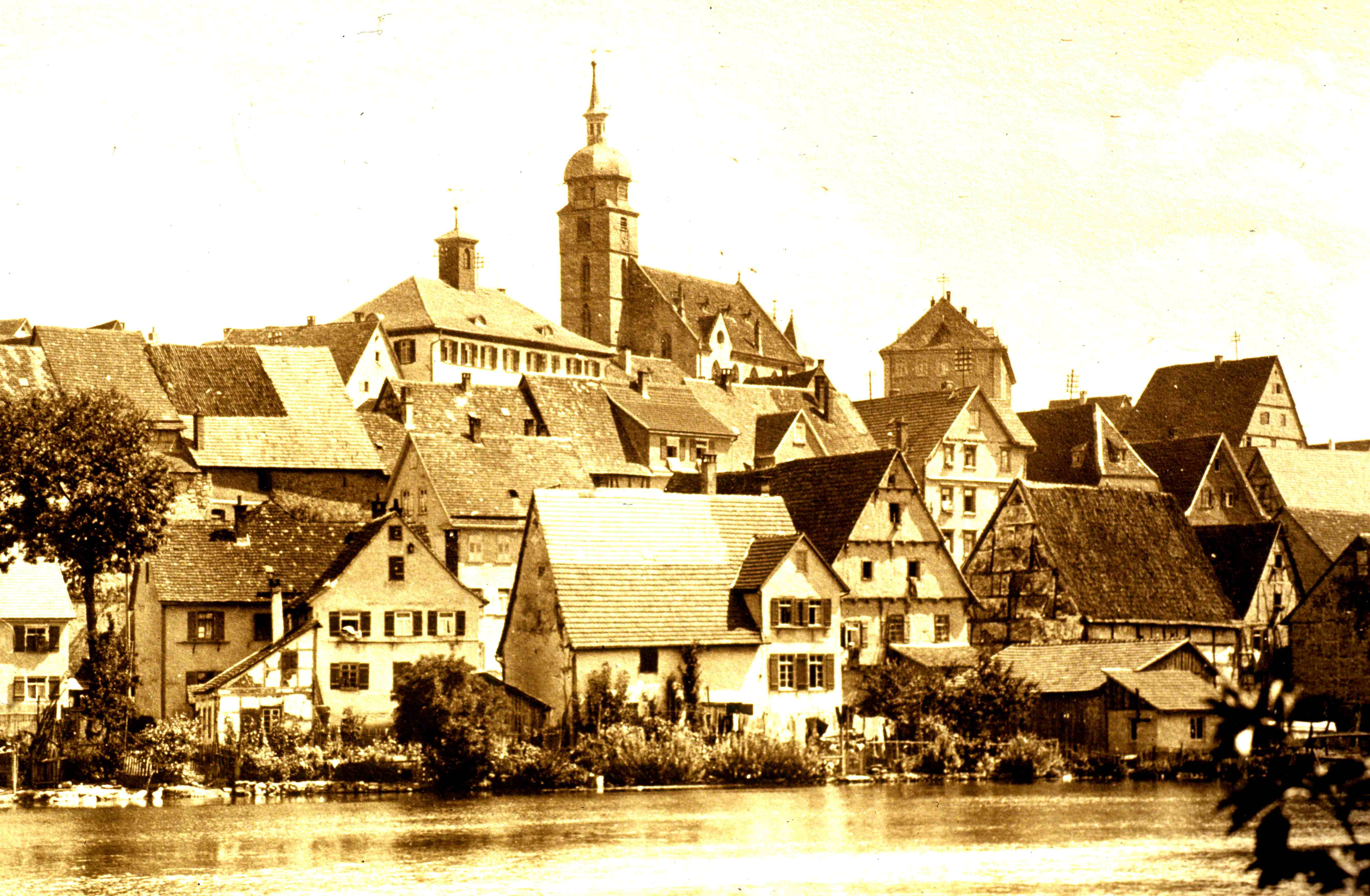
Böblingen before Second World War

During World War I, an airbase was established. It went into service on 16 August 1915. It had a significant impact on the further development of the city. In 1925 the airbase became the Landesflughafen (state airport) of Baden-Württemberg called Böblingen Airport. The aircraft pioneer Hanns Klemm (1885–1961) established his company "Klemm Leichtflugzeugbau GmbH" ("Klemm Light Aircraft Company") next to it. Until the Second World War it was the major employer in Böblingen.

During World War II, the town had a Luftwaffe airbase and military barracks. On 1 September 1939 (the day the war began) the airbase was the home station for the I/JG 52 (1st Group of the Jagdgeschwader 52) flying the Bf 109 E-1 fighter aircraft.

On the night of 7 October 1943 during World War II, Allied air forces dropped 408 incendiary bombs and 35 high explosive bombs, killing 20 men, 12 women, 12 children and wounding 200 people. 1,735 people lost their homes and 70 percent of the old town was destroyed. In July 1944, another attack followed, killing 36 more civilians.

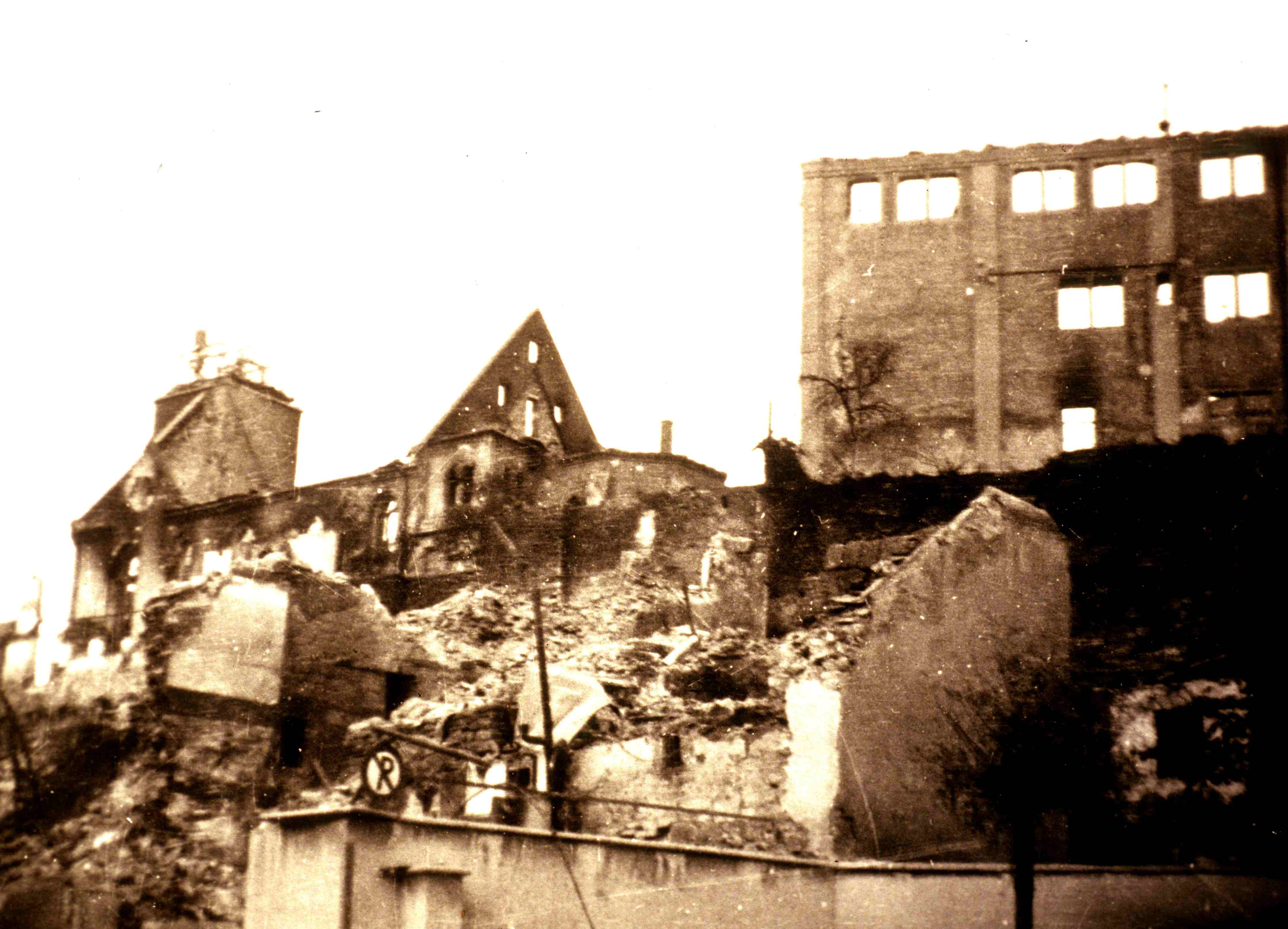
Town center after Allied bombing of civilian homes on 7 October 1943

In 1945 the district town of Böblingen fell into the American zone of occupation and belonged to the newly founded state of Württemberg-Baden, which merged in 1952 in the present state of Baden-Württemberg.

After the currency reform of 20 June 1948, a dynamic reconstruction began. The population tripled in just two decades (1950: 12,600; 1970: 37,500). With the settlement of future-oriented companies such as IBM (1949) and Hewlett-Packard (1959) as well as medium-sized companies, which have also settled on the Hulb since the 1970s, strong economic growth began in parallel with the increase in population.

In 1962, Böblingen was designated a Große Kreisstadt (major district town). Its current boundaries were established in 1971 when it was merged with the municipality of Dagersheim.

== Population history ==
Year	Number of inhabitants
1598	ca. 800
1654	628
1803	2,125
1823	2,549
1843	3,504
1861	3,287
1 December 1871	3,826
1 December 1880 ¹	4,365
1 December 1890 ¹	4,659
1 December 1900 ¹	5,303
1 December 1910 ¹	6,019
16 June 1925 ¹	7,227
16 June 1933 ¹	7,998

Year	Number of inhabitants
17 May 1939 ¹	12,560
1946	10,809
13 September 1950 ¹	12,601
6 June 1961 ¹	25,366
27 May 1970 ¹	35,925
31 December 1975	40,547
31 December 1980	41,505
27 May 1987 ¹	42,589
31 December 1990	44,903
31 December 1995	46,516
31 December 2000	45,637
30 September 2004	46,064
31 December 2013	46,714
30 June 2023	51,658

== Climate ==
The climate of Böblingen is classified as temperate oceanic(Cfb) in Köppen climate classification, which transitions to humid continental climate(Dfb).

Climate data for Böblingen (1991-2020 nromals)
Month	Jan	Feb	Mar	Apr	May	Jun	Jul	Aug	Sep	Oct	Nov	Dec	Year
Daily mean °C (°F)	0.7 (33.3)	1.5 (34.7)	4.9 (40.8)	9.0 (48.2)	13.1 (55.6)	16.5 (61.7)	18.4 (65.1)	17.9 (64.2)	13.6 (56.5)	9.3 (48.7)	4.5 (40.1)	1.6 (34.9)	9.2 (48.7)
Average precipitation mm (inches)	51.3 (2.02)	41.7 (1.64)	47.8 (1.88)	42.9 (1.69)	79.5 (3.13)	77.7 (3.06)	86.2 (3.39)	79.5 (3.13)	55.6 (2.19)	61.3 (2.41)	54.6 (2.15)	57.6 (2.27)	735.7 (28.96)
Mean monthly sunshine hours	52	70.8	120.9	170.8	197.3	194.5	202.3	193.2	144.6	105.4	56.8	41.8	1,550.4
Source: Deutscher Wetterdienst(Station: Boeblingen)(Temperature)(Precipitation)(Sun)

== Transport ==
Böblingen is easily reached by multiple forms of transport.

Air

Böblingen is about 20 minutes away from Stuttgart Airport via S-Bahn.

Automobile

The interchange between the federal freeways (Autobahn) A 8 and A 81 lies northeast from Böblingen. A 81 leads past the north of the city. The exits are Böblingen Ost (East), Böblingen/Sindelfingen, Böblingen Hulb and Ehningen. Federal highways B 464 (Renningen - Reutlingen) and B 14 run by the city.

Rail

Böblingen station is situated on the Stuttgart–Horb railway (Gäubahn) from Stuttgart to Singen. Regional trains serve the city every hour.

Local bus and rail

Local public transport within Böblingen operates under the uniform prices and coordination of the Verkehrs- und Tarifverbund Stuttgart ("Stuttgart Transit and Fare Association" or VVS). The S1 (Kirchheim unter Teck–Stuttgart–Herrenberg) S-Bahn (suburban rail) line connects Böblingen with Stuttgart and its S-Bahn network. The travel time to Stuttgart is about 25 minutes.

In 1996, the Schönbuchbahn line to Dettenhausen was re-activated. In 2004 the reactivation of the Rankbachbahn line to Renningen began and since 2010 it has been served by line S60 of the S-Bahn.

In addition to the main rail station, the following stations also serve the city: on S-Bahn line S1: Goldberg and Hulb; on the Schönbuchbahn line: Danziger Street, Böblingen Süd (South), Heusteig Street and Zimmerschlag. Numerous bus routes operate in the city, and are also under the VVS.

== U.S. military ==
Panzer Kaserne (translated as Tank Barracks) is a US base where headquarters are located for Marine Corps Forces, Europe (MARFOREUR), 'Marine Corps Forces, Africa (MARFORAF) and the 1st Battalion of the US Army's 10th Special Forces Group. This former German military installation was the home of the US Army's 7th Army Support Command (7th Army SUPCOM) until mid-1969 and its VII Corps successor VII Corps COSCOM (Corps Support Command). Later, units of the 3rd Brigade of the 1st Infantry Division (Forward) were stationed here as part of VII Corps.

In 1979, several US Army units created a tented barracks area outside the city as part of REFORGER exercises.

== Education ==
Education in Germany has two lower levels of school, Kindergarten and elementary school (Grundschule - grades 1–4), and three upper levels of school, Werkrealschule (grades 5–9/10), Realschule (5–10) and Gymnasium (5–12/13). Parents decide, at the end of the fourth grade, which level of school the child should attend based on academic performance and aptitude.

In Boeblingen there are:

- Two Werkrealschulen: Eichendorff (combined with primary school) and Theodor Heuss;
- Two Realschulen, Albert-Schweitzer and Friedrich-Schiller;
- Four Gymnasiums, Albert-Einstein, Lise-Meitner, Max-Planck and Otto-Hahn;
- Two special-needs schools (Pestalozzischule);
- Several vocational schools including: The Boeblingen Data Processing Academy, Boeblingen Commercial School, the Biotechnological High School and the Food Sciences High School;
- Eight primary schools: Eichendorff, Eduard-Moerike, Erich-Kaestner, Friedrich-Silcher, Justinus-Kerner, Ludwig-Uhland, Wilhelm-Hauff and Grundschule Dagersheim;
- Other schools include: (loosely translated) The Private Old Person Care School of the Workers' Welfare Institution Nordwuerttemberg, The Free Evangelist School of Boeblingen, The Free Rudolf Steiner/Waldorf School of Boeblingen/Sindelfingen, and the Private Technical High School in the Education Center of Boeblingen of the International Federation;
- There is an American grade school, called Stuttgart Elementary School (on the American Army base of Panzer Kaserne).
- There is an American high school, called Stuttgart High School (next to the Elementary, on the American Army base of Panzer Kaserne).

== Museums ==
- Peasants War Museum (Bauernkriegsmuseum), dedicated to the 1525 Battle of Boeblingen and the fight for freedom by German Peasants; includes today the Boeblingen urban gallery and the farmer war museum (with tin figure diorama and many text boards).
- German Butcher Museum, in a half timbered house (painted walls on the inside).
- Städtische Galerie Böblingen – Art museum

== Buildings ==
- The Protestant parish church at the market place is the landmark of the city. The church was destroyed in the Second World War and rebuilt again after the war.
- Water Tower Böblingen-Waldburg
- Disused Böblingen Airport: the first commercial airport in the Stuttgart area
- Orplid - a high-rise apartment building built by Hans Scharoun, proponent of Organic architecture

== Events ==
- Several fairs around the marketplace/Schlossplatz and the lakes (e.g. Town fair "Böblinger Jahrmarkt" in July, wine festival in September and Christmas Market in December).
- Since 1996: every year "Böblinger Sommer am See" (lit. Summer at the lake) from June to September. There are over 60 events (e.g. concerts, flea market) taking place around the two lakes in Böblingen.
- At regular intervals concerts and other events took place at the former Sporthalle (Civic Center, closed in 2007 and demolished since then) and at the Kongresshalle (Congregational hall; a place where numerous town events happen), like the Wetten, dass..? show, and concerts by international pop and rock stars.

== Business ==
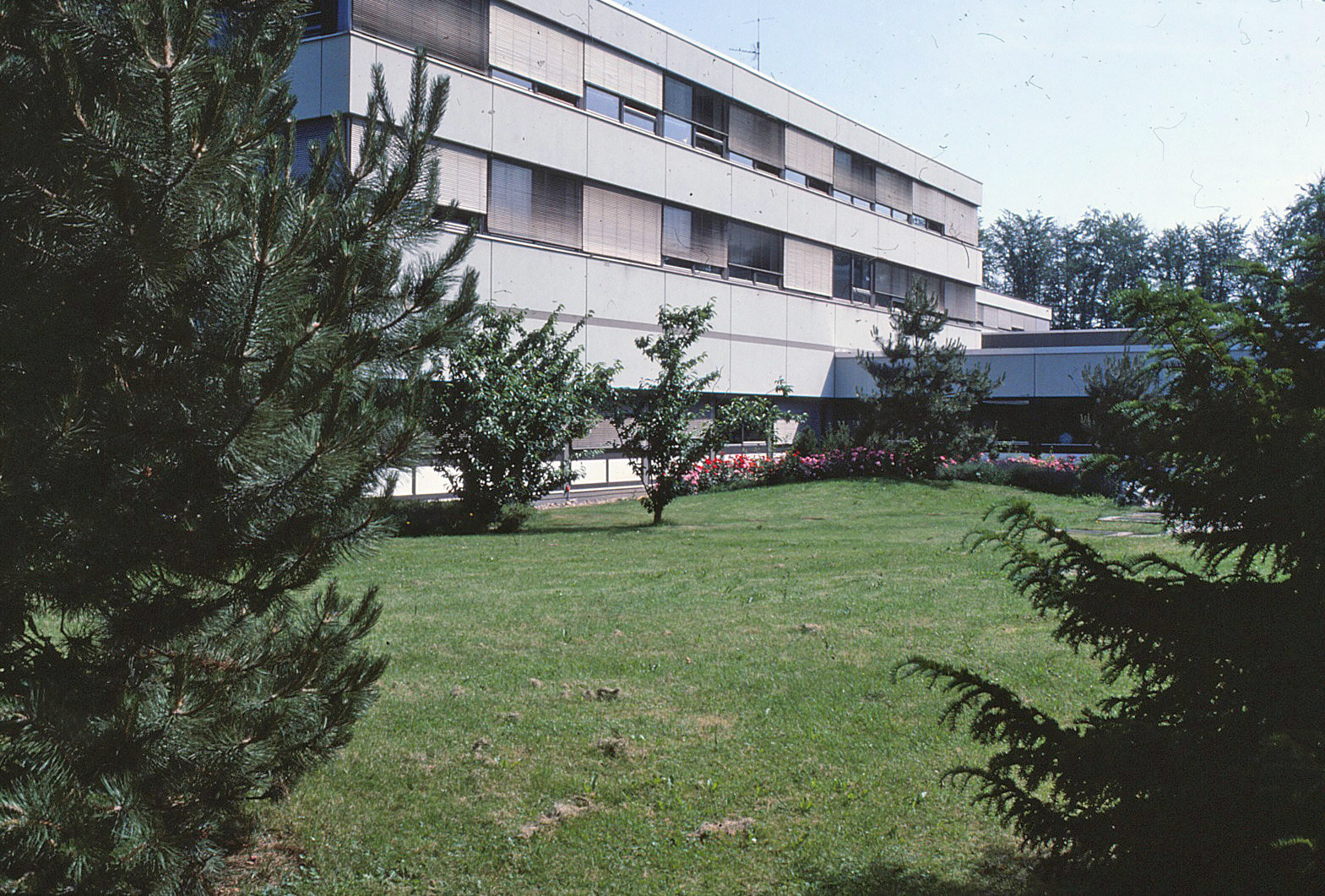
Grounds and one building of the IBM Research and Development campus in Böblingen, as seen in 1984

The Böblingen–Sindelfingen area is the location of several large enterprises:

- Advantest (Semiconductor Test)
- Agilent Technologies (Electronic Equipment, Instruments and Components)
- Avago Technologies (Semiconductors)
- Mercedes-Benz Group (Automobiles)
- HP Inc. (Computers, Software and Services)
- IBM (Computers, Software and Services)
- Keysight Technologies (Electronic Test and Measurement)
- Kroll Ontrack
- Philips (Medical Monitors)
- Smart (Automobiles)
- Softpro (Electronic Signature Verification)
- Wörwag Pharma (Drugs and Food Supplements)

Böblingen/Sindelfingen can be called a center of both automobile and computer industries. Daimler develops and manufactures its Mercedes brand of luxury cars here.

Hewlett-Packard (and its offspring) and IBM develop computer systems, software and electronic products in the area. Böblingen was once also a major center of European computer manufacturing, with an IBM semiconductor and printed circuit board lab and an HP computer systems manufacturing operation. Most of those electronics-production sites have either been closed or moved to other locations (such as nearby Herrenberg).

== Sports ==
The Sporthalle (Böblingen) served as one of two playgrounds for the FIBA EuroBasket 1971.

== Twin towns – sister cities ==
Böblingen is twinned with:

- Alba, Italy (1985)
- Bergama, Turkey (1967)
- Glenrothes, Scotland, United Kingdom (1991)
- Krems an der Donau, Austria (1972)
- Pontoise, France (1972)
- Sittard-Geleen, Netherlands (1962)
- Sömmerda, Germany (1988)

All twin towns (excluding Sömmerda) compete in a twin town Olympiad every 3 years.

== Notable people ==
- Daniel Mögling (1596–1635), alchemist and a Rosicrucian
- Wilhelm Ganzhorn (1818–1880), jurist and adjudicator, poet of the folk song: "In the most beautiful meadows"

=== Sport ===
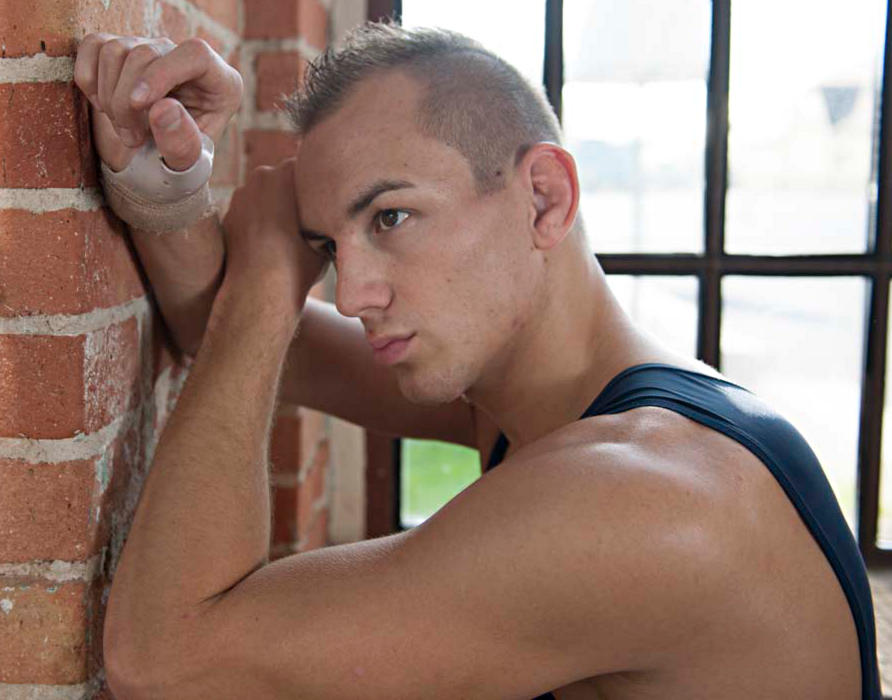
Frank Stäbler, 2014

- Birgit Hamann (born 1969), athlete, specialized in 100 metres hurdles
- Vincenzo Marchese (born 1983), footballer, played 397 games
- Lukas Kiefer (born 1993), footballer, played about 250 games
- Tevfik Altındağ (born 1988), footballer, played over 260 games
- Frank Stäbler (born 1989), Greco-Roman wrestler, multiple medallist in World Wrestling Championships
- Tim Leibold (born 1993), footballer who has played over 290 games
- Fabienne Dongus (born 1994), football midfielder who has played over 240 games and five for Germany women
