= Hyland Software =

Documentation management software company

Hyland Software, Inc.
- Type: Private
- Industry: Computer software, document management
- Founded: 1991
- Founder: Packy Hyland Jr.
- Headquarters: Westlake, Ohio, USA
- Products: OnBase enterprise content management
- Services: The OnBase Cloud; Alfresco Cloud; Nuxeo Cloud; Nuxeo Studio
- Website: www.hyland.com

Hyland Software is an American software development company headquartered in Westlake, Ohio that develops enterprise content management (ECM) and process management software suite called OnBase.

== Corporate history ==
Hyland laid off about 1,000 people in April 2023. This was described as 20% of company's workforce in 2023. Prior to this layoff in 2021, the company laid off 140 people in the United States while having added twice as many employees abroad.

=== Founding ===
The company was founded in 1991 by Packy Hyland Jr. He created a program in BASIC and sold it to the Nacedah Bank to store reports on Optical disks to meet compliance requirements, while reducing time required to find documents. In January 1992, Packy Hyland hired Miguel Zubizarreta to create a commercial software product. Miguel Zubizarreta invented the OnBase product, a client server, windows 3.0 based, C++ object-oriented solution that used the Oracle relational database as a backend. This first version of OnBase was installed at the Necedah Bank, the Bank of St.Cloud and the Roseville Bank. The OnBase product was white-labeled and sold by most of the major core providers in the Banking Industry. By 2000, over 1000 banks had the OnBase system, which was the leading check processing solution in the community banking industry. Hyland started aggressively selling through regional resellers to local and state governments, universities, insurance companies and hospitals. Eventually Hyland integrated with Epic and Guidewire, establishing strong paths to markets with leading providers.

=== Acquisition history ===
September 1, 2006: Matrix Imaging, a private enterprise content management company in Bloomfield Hills, Michigan specializing in the higher education sector

July 1, 2008: Liberty Information Management Systems (IMS), a private Costa Mesa, California-based enterprise content management company.

July 1, 2009: Valco Data Systems, a private, Salem, New Hampshire-based healthcare software and software integration company

March 1, 2010: eWebHealth, a private, Reading, Massachusetts-based provider of hosted medical records workflow

September 1, 2010: Hershey Systems, a private, Santa Fe Springs, California maker of Singularity, a document management system marketed to higher education institutions

September 24, 2010: Computer Systems Company, Inc. (dba The CSC Group), a private, Strongsville, Ohio-based provider of healthcare software and document conversion services.

August 29, 2012: SIRE Technologies, Inc., a private, Salt Lake City, Utah-based software developer focused on stuff for county and local governments

February 28, 2013: AnyDoc Software, a Tampa, Florida-based software developer focused on automated document, data capture and classification

=== Major industries ===
- Healthcare
- Government
- Higher Education
- Commercial
- Financial Services
- Insurance
- Manufacturing

=== Key people ===
Packy Hyland, Jr. is the founder of Hyland Software and developed the first version of OnBase for The Necedah Bank in Wisconsin in 1991. He served as CEO and President until 2001, when he was succeeded by his brother, A.J. Hyland, who retired in 2013 and was succeed after by Bill Priemer, formerly the firm's Chief Operating Officer. Jitesh Ghai is the current President and CEO, and succeeded Bill Priemer on May 20, 2024.

== Product ==
OnBase Logo

Hyland Software's OnBase product integrates document management, business process automation and records management. Industry analysts such as Forrester Research focus on the product's foundational ECM functionality, like imaging and archiving capabilities, as its strengths.

The OnBase product also offers integrations with Microsoft, SAP, Oracle Corporation and Lawson to gain more value from existing technologies. OnBase is written in .NET, JavaScript. OnBase was named 2015 Best in KLAS for Document Management and Imaging.

== Services ==
=== The OnBase Cloud ===
Hyland offers a Software-as-a-Service (SaaS) application of OnBase software known as the OnBase Cloud. This service is a cloud-based version of Hyland's traditional OnBase product offering; applications are hosted at a data center and accessed over a secure Internet connection.

=== Alfresco Cloud ===
Hyland offers a Platform as a service (PaaS) cloud-hosted platform of Alfresco Content Services, with customisation via Alfresco Module Packages (AMPs) and Alfresco Developer Framework (ADF) applications.

=== Nuxeo Cloud ===
Hyland offers a Platform as a service (PaaS) cloud-hosted platform of Nuxeo Content Services, configuration can be done using Nuxeo Studio.

=== Nuxeo Studio ===
Nuxeo Studio is offered as a Software-as-a-Service (SaaS) application for configuration and customisation of Nuxeo Platform.

== Recognition ==
Hyland has, however, been the subject of a corruption probe in relation to the sale of its technology to the local government of Cuyahoga County, Ohio. Notably, the company improperly received a $1.2 million contract from the county, which ultimately resulted in the indictment of a public official on numerous charges.
