= Basilica of St. Mary of the Assumption (Lancaster, Ohio) =

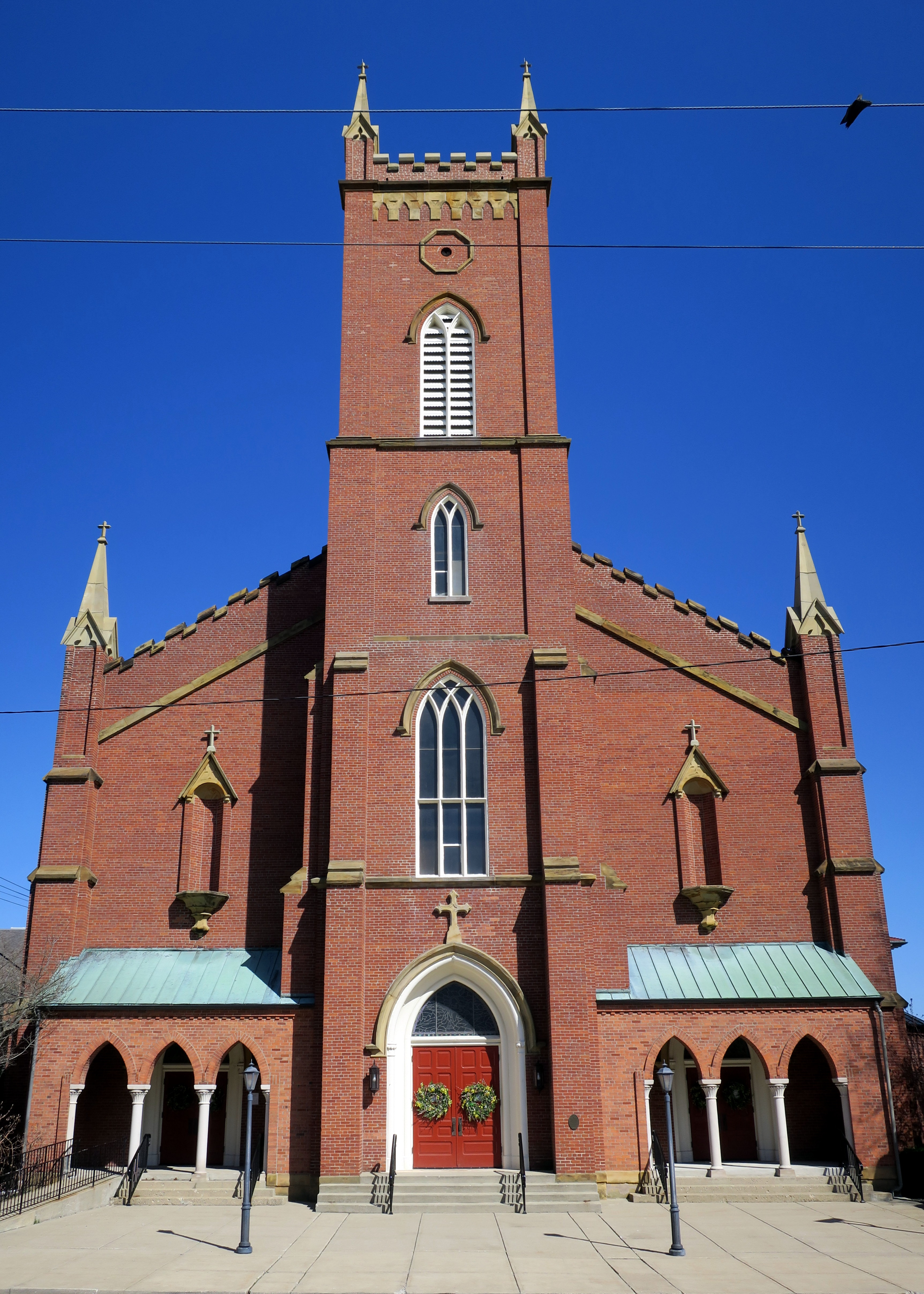
- Front of the basilica
- Basilica of St. Mary of the Assumption
- 39°42′46″N 82°35′56″W
- Location: 132 South High Street; Lancaster, Ohio
- Country: United States
- Denomination: Catholic Church
- Website: stmarylancaster.org

History
- Former name: St. Mary of the Assumption Church
- Consecrated: 1864

Architecture
- Heritage designation: NRHP 83003438
- Designated: August 11, 1983
- Style: Gothic Revival
- Completed: 1864

Administration
- Diocese: Columbus

Clergy
- Bishop: Earl K. Fernandes
- Pastor: Monsignor Craig Eilerman

The Basilica of St. Mary of the Assumption is a Minor Basilica of the Catholic Church located in Lancaster, Ohio, United States, and a parish church of the Diocese of Columbus. The parish was founded in 1818 and the current church building was completed in 1864. When the Holy See declared the church a minor basilica in 2022, it became the 91st in the United States, the seventh in Ohio, and the first in the Diocese of Columbus.

== History ==
=== Founding ===
The first Mass celebrated in Lancaster was said by Edward Fenwick, O.P., the future Archbishop of Cincinnati, in the home of Michael Garaghty, at the corner of Main and High Streets. Fenwick, his nephew and fellow priest Nicholas Young, and other Dominicans traveled from St. Joseph's Church in Somerset to minister to Catholics in Lancaster. While the exact date of the foundation of the parish is not known, it was between the end of 1818 and the dedication of the first frame church on Chestnut Street on Easter of 1819. In 1821, the Archdiocese of Cincinnati was founded and St. Mary was transferred to it from the Diocese of Bardstown.

Upon the founding of the parish, pastoral care of it was given to the Dominican Order, and in 1834 Thomas Martin was made the first resident pastor. In 1839, the parish was entrusted to diocesan clergy from Cincinnati and Joshua Young became the pastor, serving in that role for 15 years before eventually becoming the bishop of the Diocese of Erie. Young built the second church which was dedicated on November 1, 1840, as the first church had been outgrown. In 1847 a parochial school was opened, with women of the parish serving as teachers.

=== The third church ===
Following Young's move to Erie, Henry Lange became the pastor of the church in February 1854. Seeing that the present building was once again too small for its congregation, he initiated the construction of a third church, the cornerstone of which was laid on August 28, 1859, by Archbishop John Purcell of Cincinnati. However, the construction of this church was greatly hampered by the outbreak of the American Civil War, and was only able to continue because of the generosity of wealthy parishioners. Fr. Lange died on February 9, 1864, mere months before the completion and consecration of the present church on June 5 of the same year.

Several temporary pastors followed Lange before Louis DeCailly became pastor in 1868, who constructed a new parish rectory on Chestnut Street and improved the parish school, contracting Dominican Sisters to teach there in 1872. In March 1868, the Diocese of Columbus was established and the governance of St. Mary was transferred to it. in 1881, a 12-acre plot of land was purchased to serve as a parish cemetery and consecrated on All Souls' Day of that same year by Bishop John Ambrose Watterson. The parish school expanded to include a 3-year high school program in 1891, which continues on today as William V. Fisher Catholic High School.

=== Golden jubilee ===
In February 1906, J.B. Mattingly became pastor and constructed a new school building, as the prior was simply the church building of 1840 that had been repurposed. As the 100th anniversary of the founding of the parish approached, Mattingly undertook major improvements to the church itself, including a new pipe organ, pulpit, pews, and stained-glass windows. The centennial of the parish was celebrated August 15–17, 1920, with the parish congregation numbering about 3,000 at the time.

Following Mattingly as pastor was David Quailey, who expanded the high school program from three years to four, and oversaw the construction of a new high school building for the parish.

=== Post-war ===
Roland Winel was appointed pastor in June 1956, and oversaw the founding of the parish Society of Saint Vincent de Paul chapter and expansion of the parish elementary school. However, the parish high school building was deteriorating which placed it at risk of losing its state certification. John Wolf, named pastor in 1969, oversaw the fundraising and groundbreaking for what would become William V. Fisher Catholic High School which opened in 1971. The church building is a contributing property to the Square 13 Historic District (added in 1972) which itself was incorporated into the Lancaster Historic District (added in 1983). A new organ was installed in 1989.

=== Minor basilica ===
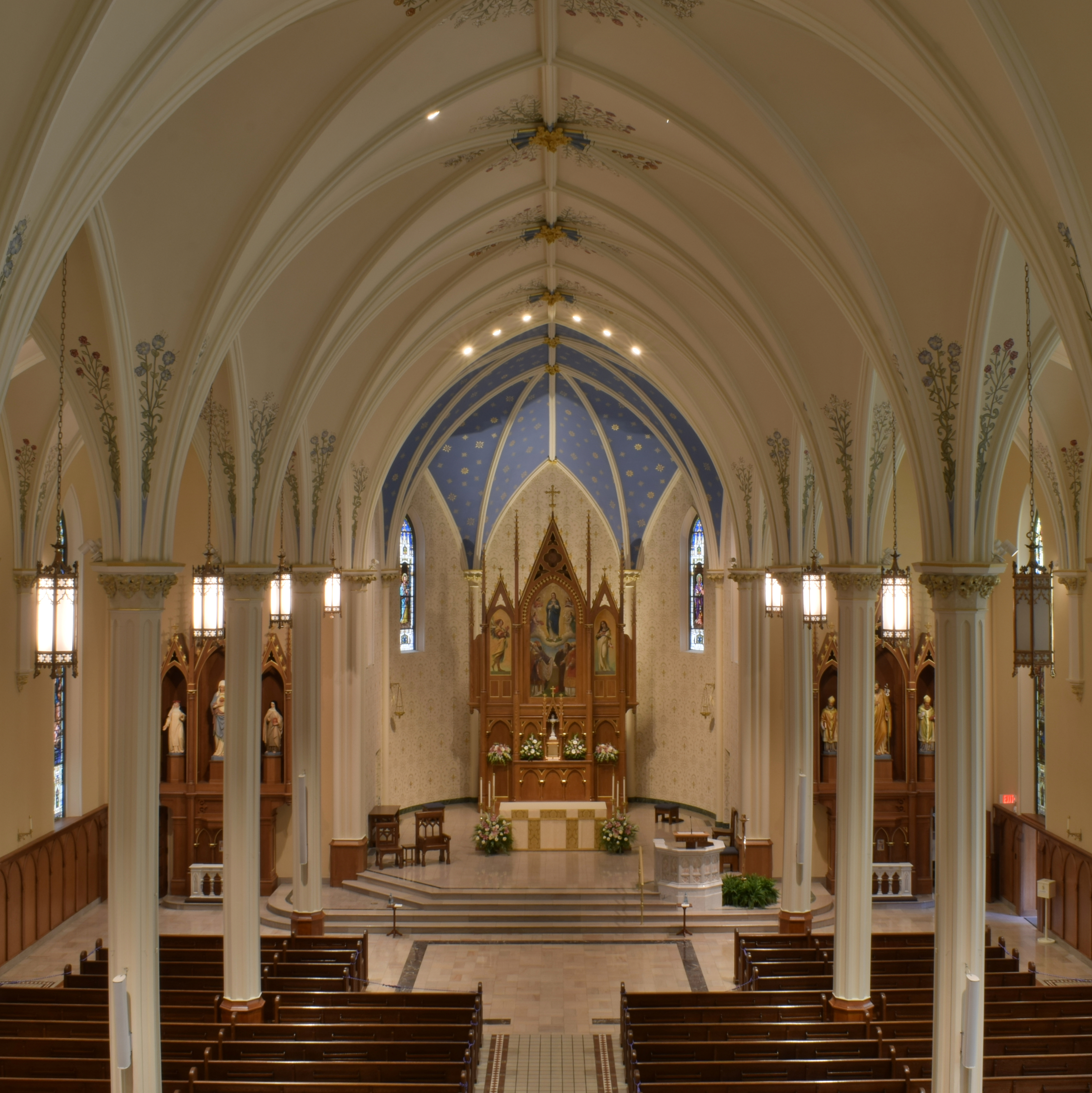
Interior as it appeared in 2021

At the start of the church's bicentennial year in August 2019, the then-Bishop of Columbus Robert Brennan was so impressed by the beauty of the parish that he asked the pastor, Craig Eilerman, if he had ever thought of pursuing having the church designated as a minor basilica. Eilerman and Brennan petitioned the Dicastery for Divine Worship and the Discipline of the Sacraments for the honor in October 2021, and the request was affirmed by bishop Earl Fernandes soon after he took office in June 2022. On July 7, 2022, Cardinal Arthur Roche bestowed the title of minor basilica upon St. Mary, and on August 14, the vigil of the Assumption of the Blessed Virgin the honor was announced to the people of the parish by Fernandes.

== Heraldic Achievement of the Basilica ==
Proper Arms of the Basilica of St. Mary of the Assumption in Lancaster, Ohio

According to the Basilica's website:

The crown and the crescent moon are taken from the Book of Revelation, chapter twelve verse one, which is read on Assumption Day each year. "A great sign appeared in the sky, a woman clothed with the sun, with the moon under her feet and on her head a crown of twelve stars." The symbol of the rising sun is often used to point to Jesus Christ as the Light of the World who rose from the darkness of death to new life by His Resurrection. The symbol of the moon then speaks of Mary, our Blessed Mother, who reflects the light of her Son to her children, and models following Him in newness of life. The crown of twelve stars represents that at Mary's assumption she was crowned Queen of Heaven, making her not only our mother but also our queen.

The third symbol in the shield depicts three stylized roses. The Lancaster Rose as it is called dates from medieval times and is a symbol for the county of Lancaster, England. The Lancaster Rose is also used by the city of Lancaster, Pennsylvania, which received its name from Lancaster, England. It was from Lancaster, Pennsylvania that pioneers came and settled our city of Lancaster, Ohio in the early 1800s, making our city on the banks of the Hocking River, the third community to bear the name Lancaster.

The three roses are also a symbol of God as the Blessed Trinity. One can as well see in the three roses a symbol for the Rosary with its traditional sets of three mysteries; Joyful, Sorrowful, and Glorious. Each rose has five petals representing the five mysteries of each set.
