= Diocese of Columbus =

Latin Catholic jurisdiction in the US

Diocese of Columbus Dioecesis Columbensis
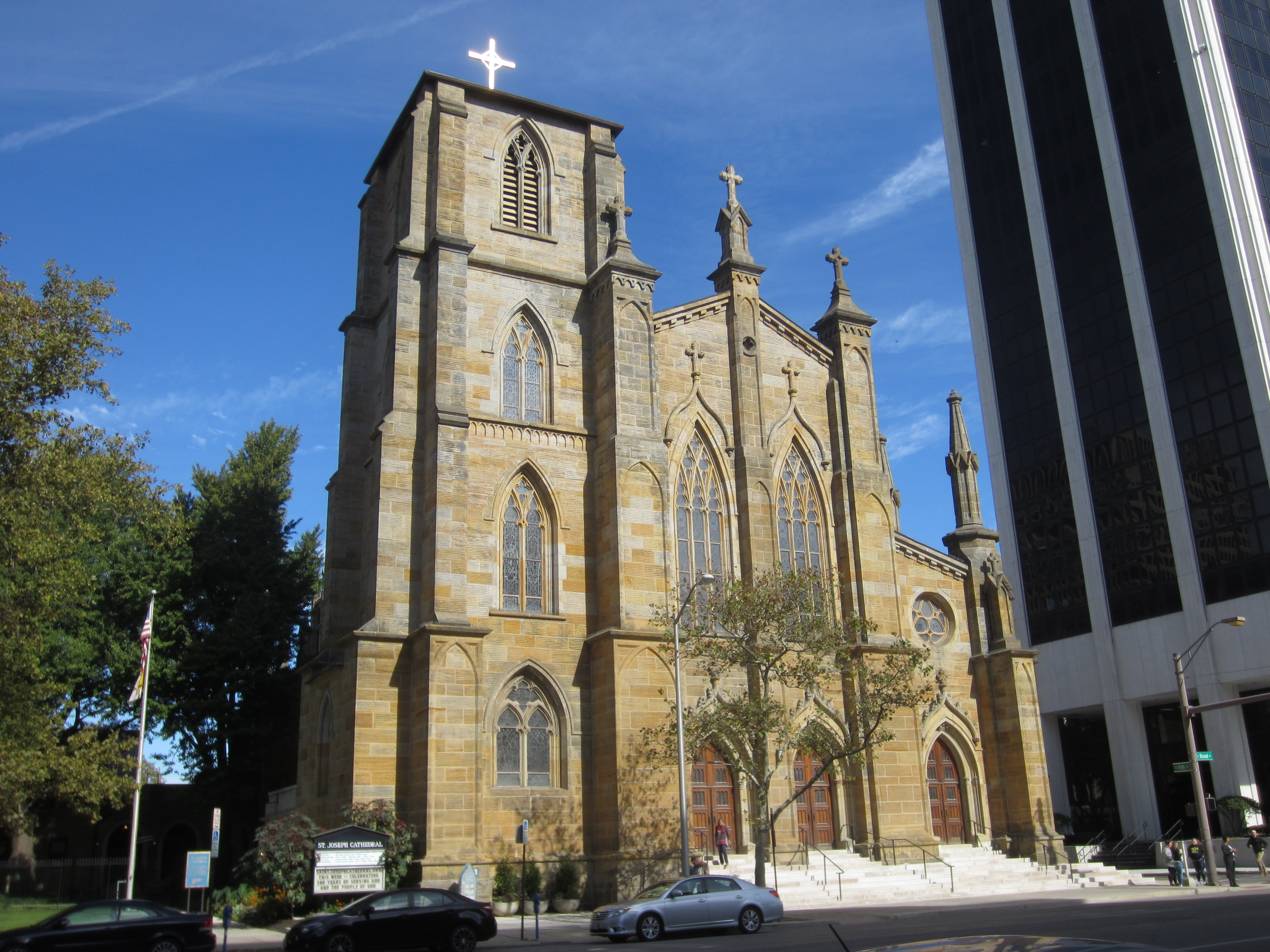
- St. Joseph Cathedral

- Coat of arms

Location
- Country: United States
- Territory: 23 counties in Central and Southern Ohio.
- Ecclesiastical province: Cincinnati
- Coordinates: 39°57′48″N 82°59′41″W

Statistics
- Area: 29,282 sq mi (75,840 km^{2})
- Population: Total; Catholics: (as of 2023); 2,794,439; 334,881 (11.9%)
- Parishes: 81

Information
- Denomination: Catholic
- Sui iuris church: Latin Church
- Rite: Roman Rite
- Established: March 3, 1868 (158 years ago)
- Cathedral: St. Joseph Cathedral
- Patron saint: St. Francis de Sales

Current leadership
- Pope: Leo XIV
- Bishop: Earl K. Fernandes
- Metropolitan Archbishop: Robert Gerald Casey
- Bishops emeritus: James Anthony Griffin, Frederick Francis Campbell

Map
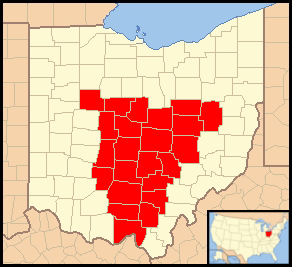

Website
- columbuscatholic.org

The Diocese of Columbus (Latin: Dioecesis Columbensis) is a diocese of the Catholic Church covering 23 counties in central Ohio in the United States. It is a suffragan diocese of the Archdiocese of Cincinnati. The mother church is St. Joseph Cathedral in Columbus. The diocese was erected in 1868. The bishop is Earl K. Fernandes as of 2026.

== Geography ==
The Diocese of Columbus contains 108 parishes in 23 counties:

Coshocton, Delaware, Fairfield, Fayette, Franklin, Hardin, Hocking, Holmes, Jackson, Knox, Licking, Madison, Marion, Morrow, Muskingum, Perry, Pickaway, Pike, Ross, Scioto, Tuscarawas, Union, and Vinton.

== History ==
=== 1700 to 1860 ===
During the 17th century, present-day Ohio was part of the French colony of New France. The Diocese of Quebec had jurisdiction over the region. However, unlike other parts of the future American Midwest, there were no attempts to found Catholic missions in Ohio.

In 1763, Ohio Country became part of the British Province of Quebec, forbidden from settlement by American colonists. After the American Revolution ended in 1783, Pope Pius VI erected the Prefecture Apostolic of the United States, encompassing the entire territory of the new nation, in 1784. Three years later, the Ohio area became part of the Northwest Territory of the United States. Pius VI created the Diocese of Baltimore, the first diocese in the United States, to replace the Prefecture Apostolic in 1789.

In 1808, Pope Pius VII erected the Diocese of Bardstown in Kentucky, with jurisdiction over the new state of Ohio along with the other midwest states. Dominican priests from Bardstown were the first missionaries and clergy in the Columbus area. The first Catholic chapel built in Ohio was a log structure in Perry County; it was dedicated in 1818 by Edward Fenwick.

Pope Pius VII erected the Diocese of Cincinnati in 1821, taking all of Ohio from Bardstown. The 1836 visit of Cincinnati Bishop John Purcell to central Ohio began the activity of the Catholic Church in Columbus. After celebrating mass in a house on Canal Street, Purcell asked the male congregants to build their own church. They developed a plan to build on a lot already owned by local Catholics. In 1837, the diocese sent a resident pastor, Henry Juncker, to minister to Catholics in the Columbus and Chillicothe areas. Juncker built Holy Cross Church, opening it in 1838. By 1843, Holy Cross Parish was scheduling multiple masses on Sundays and building a school.

In 1849, St. Francis Hospital opened in Columbus, staffed by Sisters of the Poor of St. Francis. For the first time in American history, a medical school, the Starling Medical College, was located within a hospital. The college became the Ohio State University College of Medicine.

=== 1860 to 1900 ===
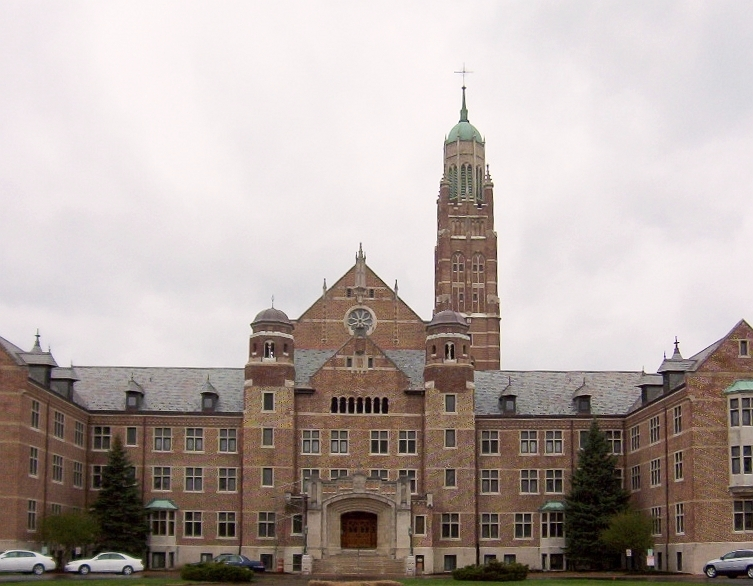
Pontifical College Josephinum, Columbus, Ohio (2011)

At the close of the Second Plenary Council of Baltimore in 1866, the American bishops petitioned Pope Pius IX to establish a new diocese with its seat in Columbus. On March 3, 1868, Pius IX erected the Diocese of Columbus, encompassing the portions of Ohio "...lying south of 40' and 41" and between the Ohio River on the East and the Scioto River on the West together with the Counties of Franklin, Delaware and Morrow." The pope named Auxiliary Bishop Sylvester Rosecrans of Cincinnati as the first bishop of Columbus.

When the Diocese of Columbus was erected, it had only three churches, all in the city of Columbus: Holy Cross, St. Patrick's, and St. Mary's. The diocese was mostly agricultural, having been settled first by Maryland and Pennsylvania residents who had moved west, and then by German and Irish immigrants. Rosecrans established the Catholic Columbian, a newspaper for the diocese, in addition to opening St. Aloysius Seminary. Rosecrans opened the St. Vincent's Orphan Asylum in Columbus in 1875.

In the early 1870s John Joseph Jessing, a German priest, had opened an orphanage for German boys in Pomeroy. He relcated it to Columbus in 1877, where he also opened a trade school for the boys. Rosecrans consecrated St. Joseph Cathedral in 1878; he died the day after the ceremony.

Pope Leo XIII selected John Watterson of Columbus to be the second bishop of that diocese; he took office in 1880. The major challenge facing the diocese was the debt it accrued building St. Joseph's Cathedral. In 1886, Mount Carmel Hospital opened in Columbus, staffed by the Sisters of the Holy Cross from Notre Dame, Indiana.

Jessing opened the Collegium Josephinum, a seminary for the German orphans who wanted to enter the priesthood, in 1888. Four years later, the Vatican granted pontifical statues to Jessing's seminary. Today it is known as the Pontifical College Josephinum. Watterson died in 1899. During his 19-year tenure, Watterson saw an increase in the number of priests and schools in the diocese and erected many new missions and parishes.

=== 1900 to 1945 ===
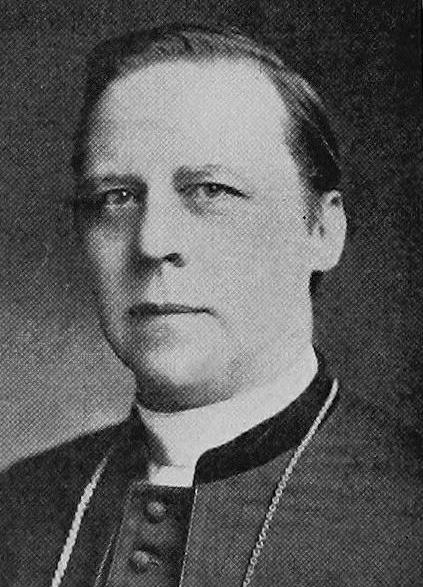
Bishop Moeller (1918)

In 1900, Henry K. Moeller of Cincinnati was appointed the third bishop of Columbus by Leo XIII. During his episcopacy, the diocesan debt was split among the parishes and nearly eliminated in three years and a diocesan synod was convened. Moeller also established missions, parishes, and schools to serve the increasing immigrant population of the Diocese. Moeller was appointed as the coadjutor bishop of Cincinnati by Pope Pius X in 1903.

Moeller's replacement, James Hartle of Columbus, was named bishop of Columbus by Pius X in 1903. Hartley oversaw a significant growth of the diocese. In 1905, he erected his first parishes, Holy Rosary and St. Aloysius. The following year, he retired the debt on St. Joseph Cathedral. Within the first five years of his episcopate, Hartley began or dedicated over 25 churches, schools, and chapels. During his tenure, the following institutions were established :

- St. Ann Hospital in Westerville (1908) by the Sisters of St. Francis of Penance and Charity.Today it is Mount Carmel St. Ann's.
- St. Joseph Cemetery in Lockbourne (1910) by Hartley
- Good Samaritan Hospital in Zanesville by the Franciscan Sisters of Christian Charity (1915).It later became part of Genesis Hospital.

The Dominican Sisters of Peace in 1911 opened College of St. Mary of the Springs in Columbus, a college for Women. Today it is Ohio Dominican University. In 1919, the Sisters of Charity of Nazareth founded Mercy Hospital in Mount Vernon.The Sisters of St. Francis established Mercy Hospital in Portsmouth in 1921. It later became part of Southern Ohio Medical Center.

Hartley founded St. Charles Seminary, a minor seminary in Columbus, in 1923. Today it is St. Charles Preparatory School. The Sisters of St. Francis of Penance and Christian Charity opened the St. Therese Shrine in Columbus in 1931. Toward the end of his term as bishop, Hartley in 1941 consecrated Edward Hettinger of Columbus as the first auxiliary bishop of the diocese. Hartley died in 1944.

=== 1945 to 1968 ===
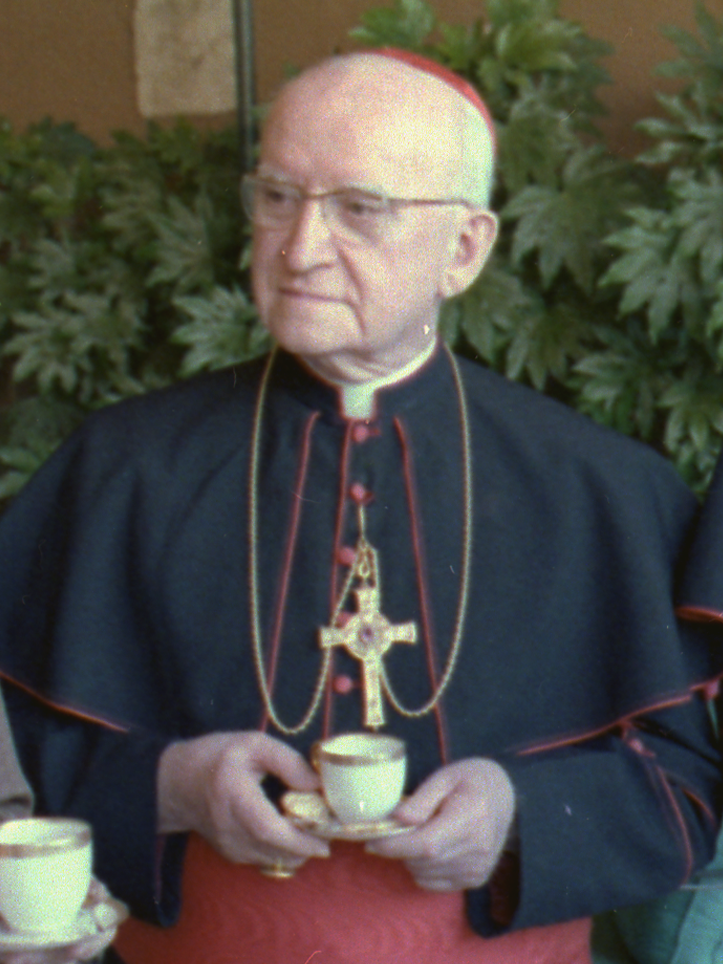
Bishop Carberry (1978)

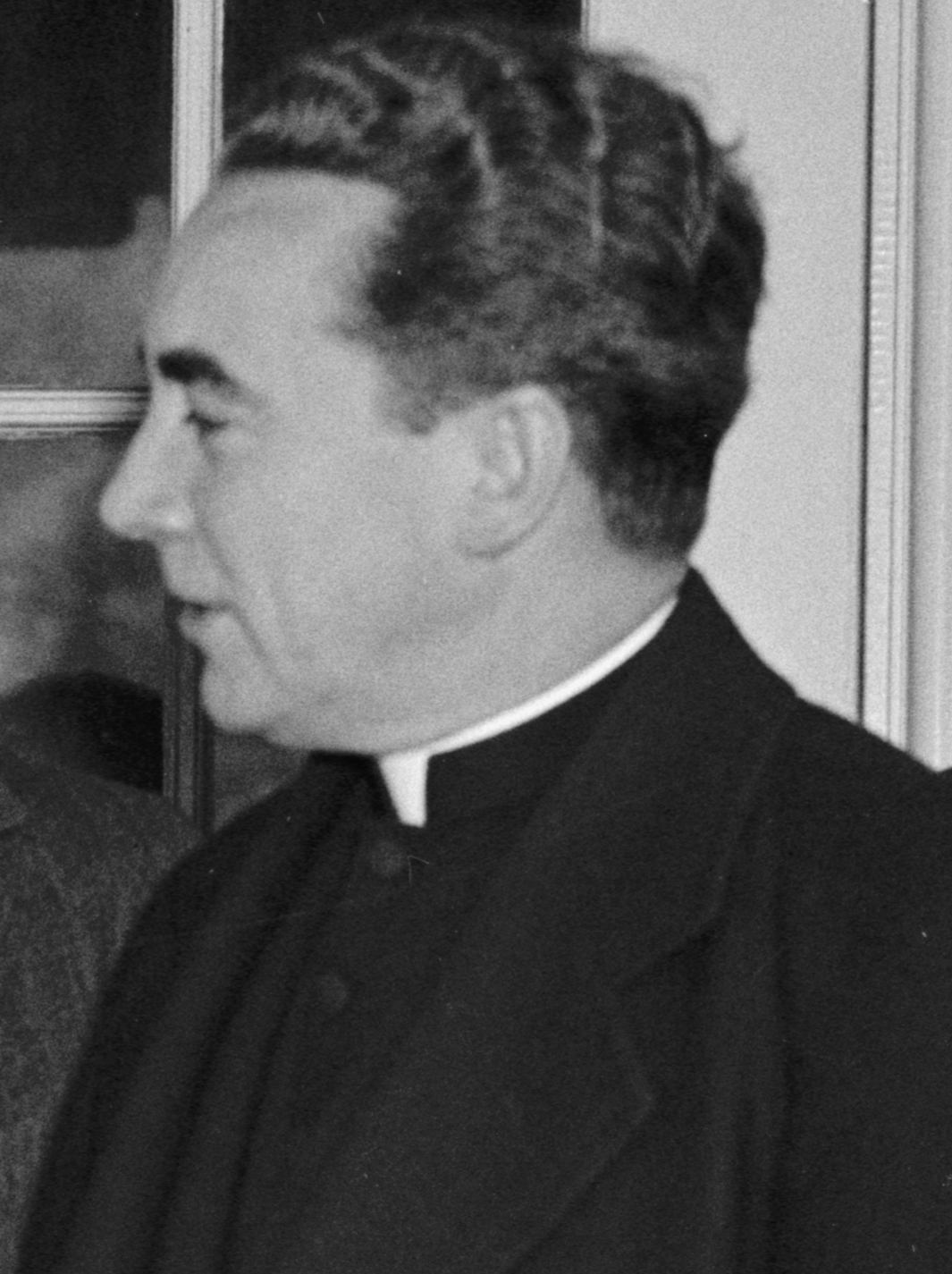
Bishop Ready (pre-1955)

Michael Ready from the Diocese of Cleveland was appointed bishop of Columbus by Pope Pius XII in 1945. That same year, the Vatican established the Diocese of Steubenville, removing 13 counties from the Diocese of Columbus to form the new diocese. At the same time, the Vatican added nine counties to the Diocese of Columbus from the Archdiocese of Cincinnati.

One of Ready's first tasks was overseeing the erection of Steubenville. He established the Catholic Welfare Bureau for the Diocese of Columbus in 1945 and appointed a director of charities for the diocese. Today it is called Catholic Social Services. In 1949, Ready razed the original bishop's house, replacing it with a combination bishop's residence and diocesan chancery building. Ready was a critic of the Ohio State University board of trustees' decision in 1951 that required all campus speakers be cleared by University President Howard L. Bevis in advance.

Ready also organized the Holy Name Society, a parent-teacher organization, the Council of Catholic Women, the Catholic Youth Council, and the St. Vincent de Paul Society in the diocese. Ready founded two nursing homes, the diocesan Child Guidance Center in Columbus, and the Catholic Student Center at Ohio State University. He worked with his fellow Ohio bishops to start the Ohio Catholic Welfare Conference. Ready died in 1957. Ready created 18 new parishes and built nine elementary schools and five high schools.

Pope Pius XII appointed Auxiliary Bishop Clarence Issenmann of Cincinnati as the sixth bishop of Columbus in 1957. As bishop, Issenmann established the Diocesan Development Fund to aid the expansion of the diocese. He added eight parishes and six high schools during his term. Issenmann also founded a new building to house diocesan offices, and offered a televised mass every week. Pope Paul VI named Issenmann as coadjutor bishop of Cleveland in 1964.

Bishop John Carberry from the Diocese of Lafayette in Indiana was appointed the seventh bishop of Columbus by Paul VI in 1965. As bishop, he implemented the reforms of the Second Vatican Council of the early 1960s. Carberry also supported the American Civil Rights Movement and the ecumenical movement. He established the Clergy Advisory Council and oversaw the renovation of St. Joseph's Cathedral after issuing regulations for liturgical changes. Carberry also bought a new building to centralize the offices of the diocesan chancery. He helped found the Inter-Church Board for Metropolitan Affairs, the first organization in the United States uniting Protestants and Catholics for ecumenism and social action. In 1968, Carberry became the first Catholic bishop to receive the Ohio Council of Churches' annual "Pastor of Pastors" award. Carberry was named archbishop of the Archdiocese of St. Louis in 1968.

=== 1968 to 1982 ===
Paul VI named Auxiliary Bishop Clarence Elwell from Cleveland as the eighth bishop of Columbus in 1968. During his tenure as bishop, Elwell continued the implementation of the reforms of the Second Vatican Council, initiated under Carberry. An advocate of Catholic education, he opened Tuscarawas Central Catholic High School in New Philadelphia in 1970 and William V. Fisher Catholic High School in Lancaster the next year

In 1972, Elwell established Resurrection Cemetery in Lewis Center and St. Peter Parish in Worthington. He created a sisters' council and pastoral council for the diocese, expanded the Development Office, and established the Parish Aid Fund, and the diocesan self-insurance program. Elwell died in 1973.

Auxiliary Bishop Edward Herrmann from the Archdiocese of Washington was appointed bishop of Columbus in 1973 by Paul VI. Herrmann helped establish Operation Feed in Columbus, a countywide food drive that now provides millions of meals every year to people in the Columbus area. He also reorganized the diocese into the 15 vicariates and instituted the Emmaus Spirituality Program for priests. Hermann died in 1982.

=== 1982 to 2020 ===
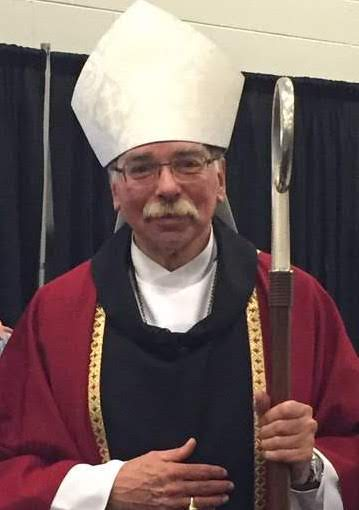
Bishop Campbell (2019)

In 1983, Pope John Paul II appointed Auxiliary Bishop James Griffin from Cleveland as the tenth bishop of Columbus. In 1985, Griffin established the Foundation of the Catholic Diocese of Columbus and initiated the Legacy of Catholic Learning campaign and Challenge In Changing Times campaign. He also established the "Breaking The Silence" task force to reduce family violence. Griffin also served on a number of committees of the United States Conference of Catholic Bishops and was president of Catholic Relief Services (1991–1995). In 2004, after 21 years as bishop of Columbus, Griffin retired.

In 2004, John Paul II appointed Auxiliary Bishop Frederick F. Campbell from the Archdiocese of St. Paul and Minneapolis as the eleventh bishop of Columbus. In 2005, Campbell proposed the establishment of a civil registry of priests from the diocese who had been "credibly accused" of sexual abuse. Campbell spoke out in 2006 against a proposed law in the Ohio General Assembly that would have allowed a 20-year statute of limitations for prosecution of sexual abuse cases. In his testimony to the assembly, Campbell stated that the 20-year window was not fair and would curtail the church's charitable work. In the end, the assembly passed the legislation with a 10-year window on prosecutions.

In 2013, the diocese fired Carla Hale, a teacher at Bishop Watterson High School in Columbus. The diocese took action after receiving a complaint that Hale had a female domestic partner. Hale then threatened to file a complaint with the City of Columbus under its anti-discrimination ordinances. Hale and the diocese later reached a settlement in which she would not return to Bishop Watterson.

After Campbell resigned as bishop of Columbus in 2019, Pope Francis appointed Auxiliary Bishop Robert J. Brennan from the Diocese of Rockville Centre to replace Campbell. Brennan initiated the elevation of Saint Mary of the Assumption Church in Lancaster to the rank of a minor basilica in August 2019. In December 2020, Brennan announced the "Real Presence Real Future" strategic planning initiative. He described its aim at "...increasing the presence of Christ throughout its 23 counties over the next three years and upholding the Faith for future generations." According to Brennan, the process would likely result in some parishes closing.

=== 2020 to present ===
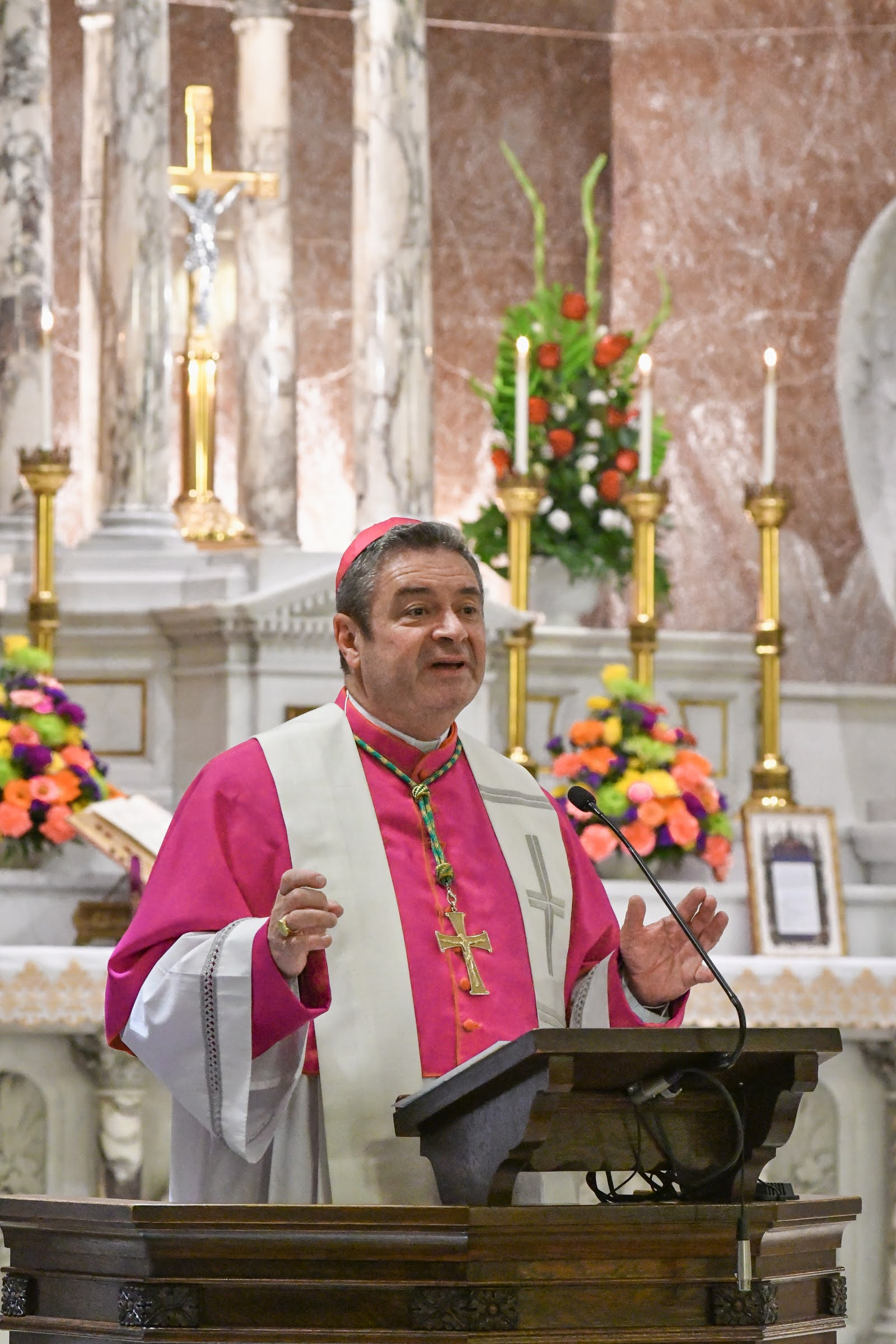
Bishop Brennan (2020)

In February 2020, the diocese announced the closure of two diocesan retreat centers, St. Therese's in Columbus and Sts. Peter and Paul in Newark. The shuttering was due to dwindling use in part because of more parishes having parish centers, newer non-diocesan facilities being built, and the necessity of repairs at both sites.

- Sts. Peter and Paul was constructed as a seminary for the Pontifical Institute for Foreign Missions in 1957. It closed in 1990, was acquired by the diocese and reopened as a retreat center in 2003. It served as the convent for the Dominican Nuns of the Perpetual Rosary until that community left the diocese in 2023.
- St. Therese Retreat Center opened in 1931. St. Therese now houses the Daughters of Holy Mary of the Heart of Jesus, a group ministering to girls and young women.

Brennan was named bishop of the Diocese of Brooklyn by Francis in 2021; Francis then named Earl K. Fernandes of Cincinnati in 2022 as bishop of Columbus. Fernandes continued the "Real Presence Real Future" process started by Brennan. In October 2022, the Diocese of Steubenville announced that the Vatican was considering merging it with the Diocese of Columbus. However, facing strong opposition within Steubenville, Bishop Jeffrey Monforton of Steubenville announced a few weeks later that the Vatican placed the merger proposal on hold.

In May 2023, the diocese announced that it would close 15 parishes as part of the “Real Presence, Real Future” initiative. The closings were attributed to the drop in mass attendance and the shortage of priests.

== Bishops ==
=== Bishops of Columbus ===
1. Sylvester Horton Rosecrans (1868–1878)
2. John Ambrose Watterson (1880–1899)
3. Henry K. Moeller (1900–1903), later Archbishop of Cincinnati
4. James Joseph Hartley (1903–1944)
5. Michael Joseph Ready (1944–1957)
6. Clarence George Issenmann (1957–1964), later Bishop of Cleveland
7. John Joseph Carberry (1965–1968), later Archbishop of Saint Louis and cardinal
8. Clarence Edward Elwell (1968–1973)
9. Edward John Herrmann (1973–1982)
10. James Anthony Griffin (1983–2004)
11. Frederick Francis Campbell (2005–2019)
12. Robert J. Brennan (2019–2021), later Bishop of Brooklyn
13. Earl K. Fernandes (2022–present)

=== Auxiliary bishops of Columbus ===
- Edward Gerard Hettinger (1941–1977)
- George Avis Fulcher (1976–1983), later Bishop of Lafayette in Indiana

=== Other diocesan priests who became bishops ===
- Nicholas Aloysius Gallagher (1846–1916), appointed Bishop of Galveston in 1892
- Francis William Howard, appointed Bishop of Covington in 1923

== Parishes ==
As of 2020, the Diocese of Columbus comprises 103 parishes and two missions.

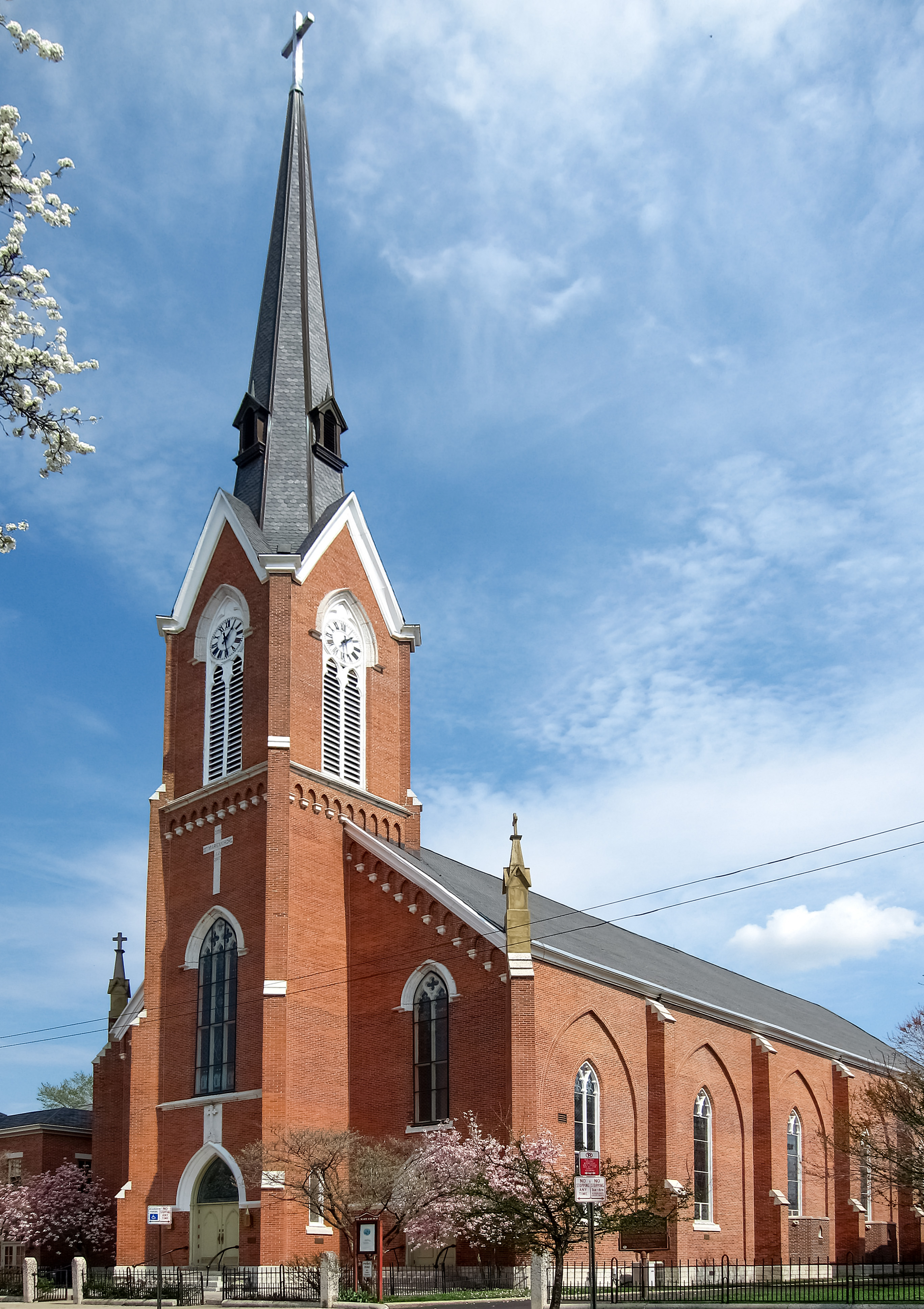
Saint Mary of the Assumption Church, South Columbus Deanery (2012)

== Education ==
=== Museum of Catholic Art and History ===
The diocese is home to the Museum of Catholic Art and History – the largest institution of its kind in the United States It was founded in 1998 as the Jubilee Museum.

=== Colleges ===
- Mount Carmel College of Nursing – Columbus
- Ohio Dominican University – Columbus
- Pontifical College Josephinum – Columbus (Jurisdiction of the Apostolic Nuncio)

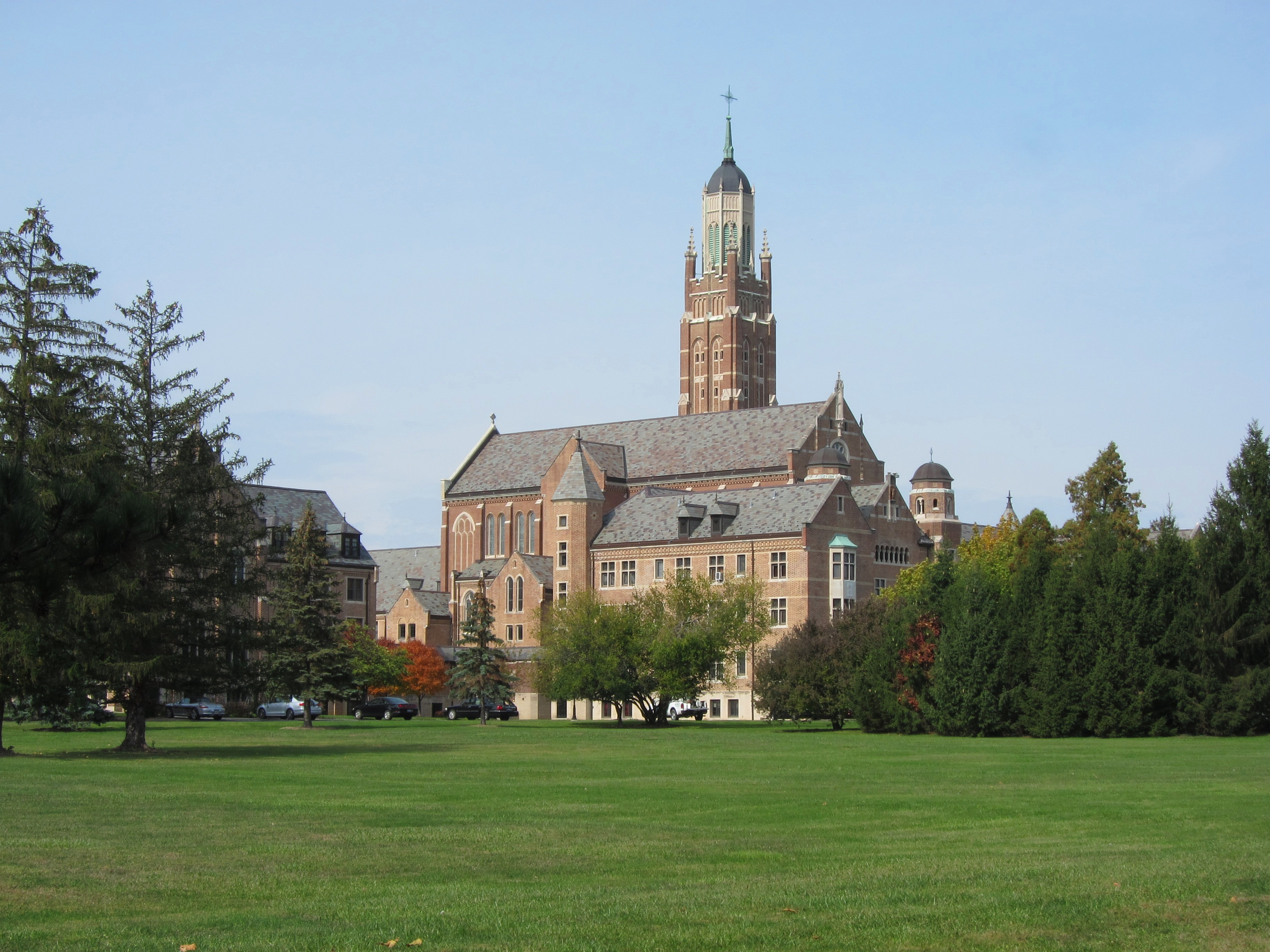
The Pontifical College Josephinum, Columbus (2012)

=== High schools ===
- Bishop Hartley High School – Columbus
- Bishop Ready High School – Columbus
- Bishop Rosecrans High School – Zanesville
- Bishop Watterson High School – Columbus
- Cristo Rey Columbus High School – Columbus
- Newark Catholic High School – Newark
- Notre Dame Schools – Portsmouth
- St. Charles Preparatory School – Columbus
- St. Francis DeSales High School – Columbus
- Tuscarawas Central Catholic Jr./Sr. High School – New Philadelphia
- William V. Fisher Catholic High School – Lancaster

== Hospitals ==
- Genesis HealthCare System – Zanesville (combination of Good Samaritan Hospital and Bethesda Hospital). Good Samaritan Hospital began in 1900 and is co-sponsored by the Franciscan Sisters of Christian Charity of Manitowoc – Wisconsin.
- Mt. Carmel Health System – Columbus (Mt. Carmel – East; Mt. Carmel – West; St. Ann, Westerville). Mt. Carmel opened in 1886, by the Sisters of the Holy Cross from St. Mary's, Indiana. In 1972, Mt. Carmel East opened to serve the suburbs. Also, St. Ann's Hospital was bought by Mt. Carmel in 1995. At one time, St. Ann's was operated by the Sisters of St. Francis of Penance and Christian Charity.
- Trinity Health System Twin City Medical Center – Dennison. Bought by the Sisters of St. Francis of Sylvania in May 2011.

== Religious institutes ==
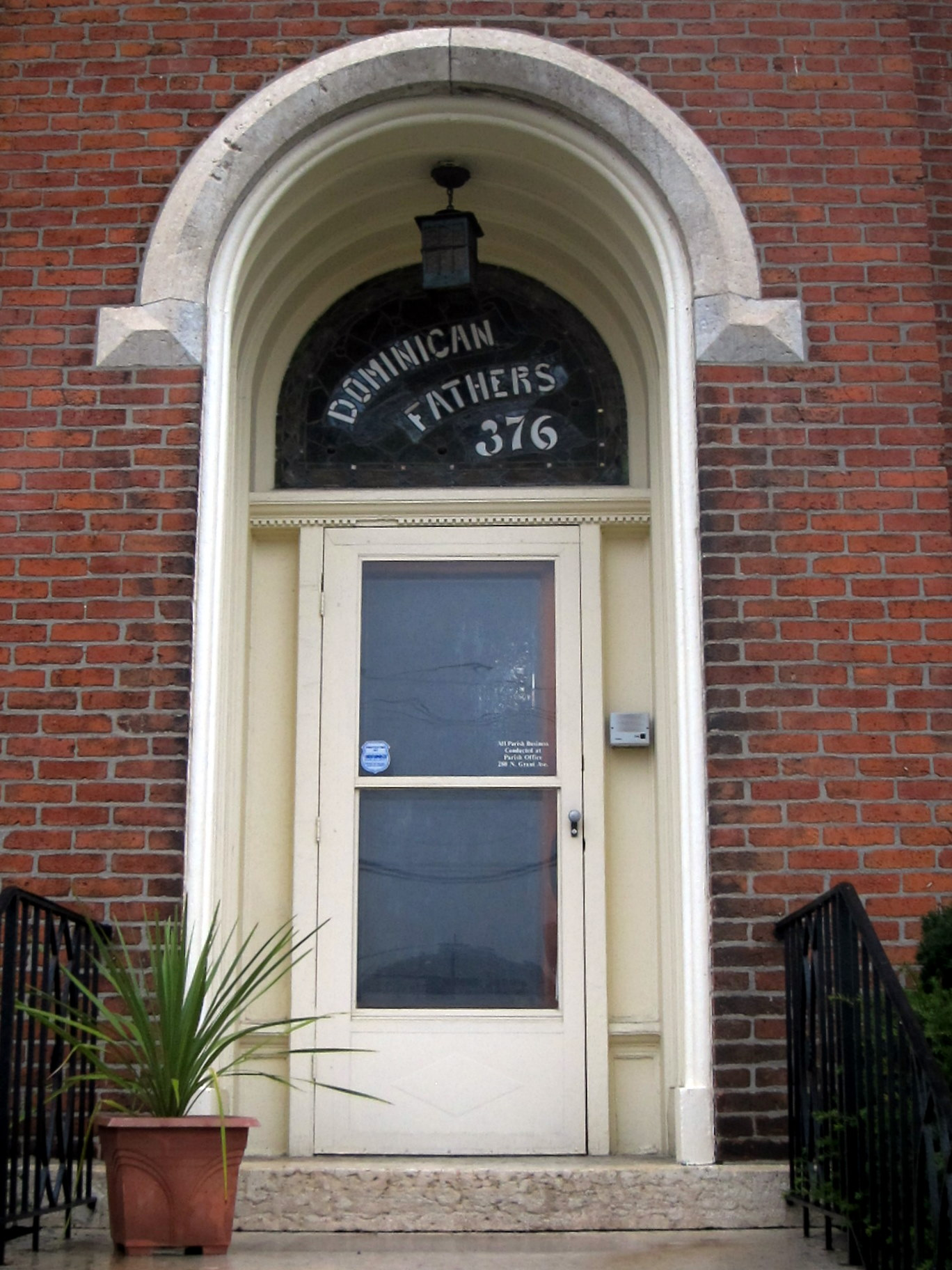
Entrance to the Dominican Province of St. Joseph at St. Patrick Church in Columbus

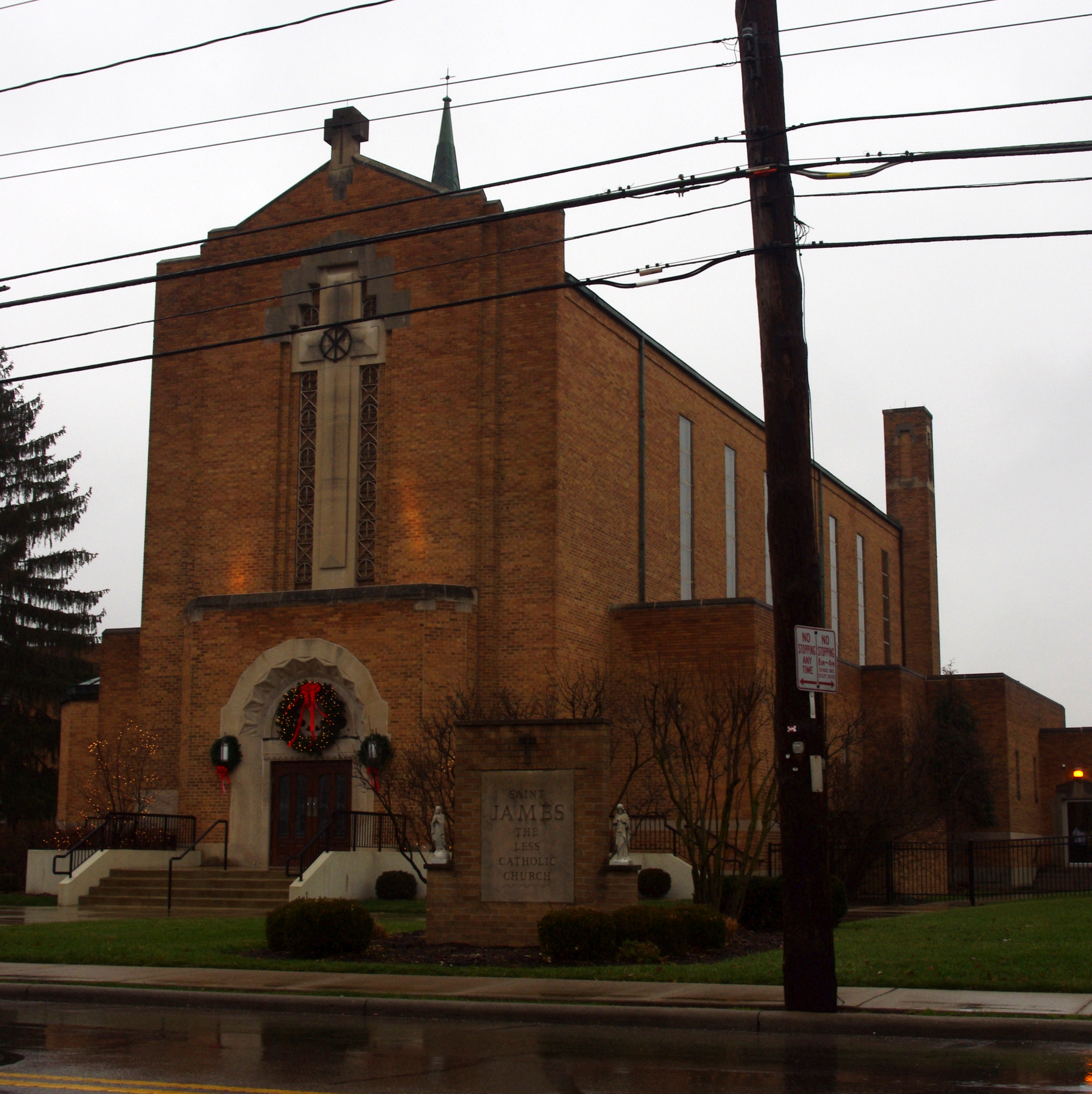
Saint James the Less Church in Columbus

=== Religious men ===
| Religious Order | Location Served |
|---|---|
| Apostles of Jesus | |
| Congregation of the Holy Spirit | |
| Congregation of Clerics Regular of the Divine Providence (Theatines) | St. Joseph – Dover Holy Trinity – Zoar Christ the King – Columbus |
| Fathers of Mercy | |
| Glenmary Home Missioners | |
| Heralds of the Good News | St. John Neumann – Sunbury Church of the Resurrection – New Albany |
| Institute of Christ the King Sovereign Priest (ICKSP) | St. Leo – Merion Village |
| Institute of the Incarnate Word | |
| Missionaries of the Precious Blood | St. James the Less – Columbus |
| Missionary Servants of the Word | St. Stephen the Martyr – Columbus St. Agnes – Columbus |
| Order of the Blessed Virgin Mary of Mercy (Mercerdarians) | Holy Family – Columbus |
| Order of Friars Minor | |
| Order of Preachers (Dominicans) | Holy Trinity – Somerset Pontifical College Josephinum Ohio Dominican University St. Joseph – Somerset St. Patrick – Columbus |
| Society of the Catholic Apostolate (Pallottines) | Sacred Heart – Columbus St. Christopher |
| Sons of the Immaculate Conception Congregation | Mt. Carmel Hospitals St. Elizabeth – Columbus |

=== Religious sisters ===
- Bridgettine Sisters (Order of the Most Holy Savior) – Holy Family Church – Columbus
- Carmelite Sisters for the Aged and Infirm – Columbus
- Daughters of Holy Mary of the Heart of Jesus
- Dominican Sisters of Mary, Mother of the Eucharist, St. Michael School – Worthington
- Dominican Sisters of Peace – Columbus
- Dominican Sisters of the Immaculate Conception – Columbus
- Franciscan Sisters of Christian Charity – Zanesville
- Franciscan Sisters of the Immaculate Heart of Mary – Our Lady of Peace – Columbus
- Franciscan Sisters of the Immaculate Heart of Mary (from Kerala) – St. Peter – Chillicothe
- Leaven of the Immaculate Heart of Mary – Portsmouth
- Little Servant Sisters of the Immaculate Conception – Columbus, St. John Paul II Education Center
- Salesian Sisters of Don Bosco, St. Francis DeSales High School – Columbus
- Sisters of Charity of Cincinnati – Columbus and Mount Vernon
- Sisters of Notre Dame de Namur – Columbus
- Sisters of the Good Shepherd – Columbus
- Sisters of the Holy Cross – Columbus
- Sisters of St. Francis of Penance and Christian Charity – Columbus
- Third Order of St. Francis (Joliet) – Columbus

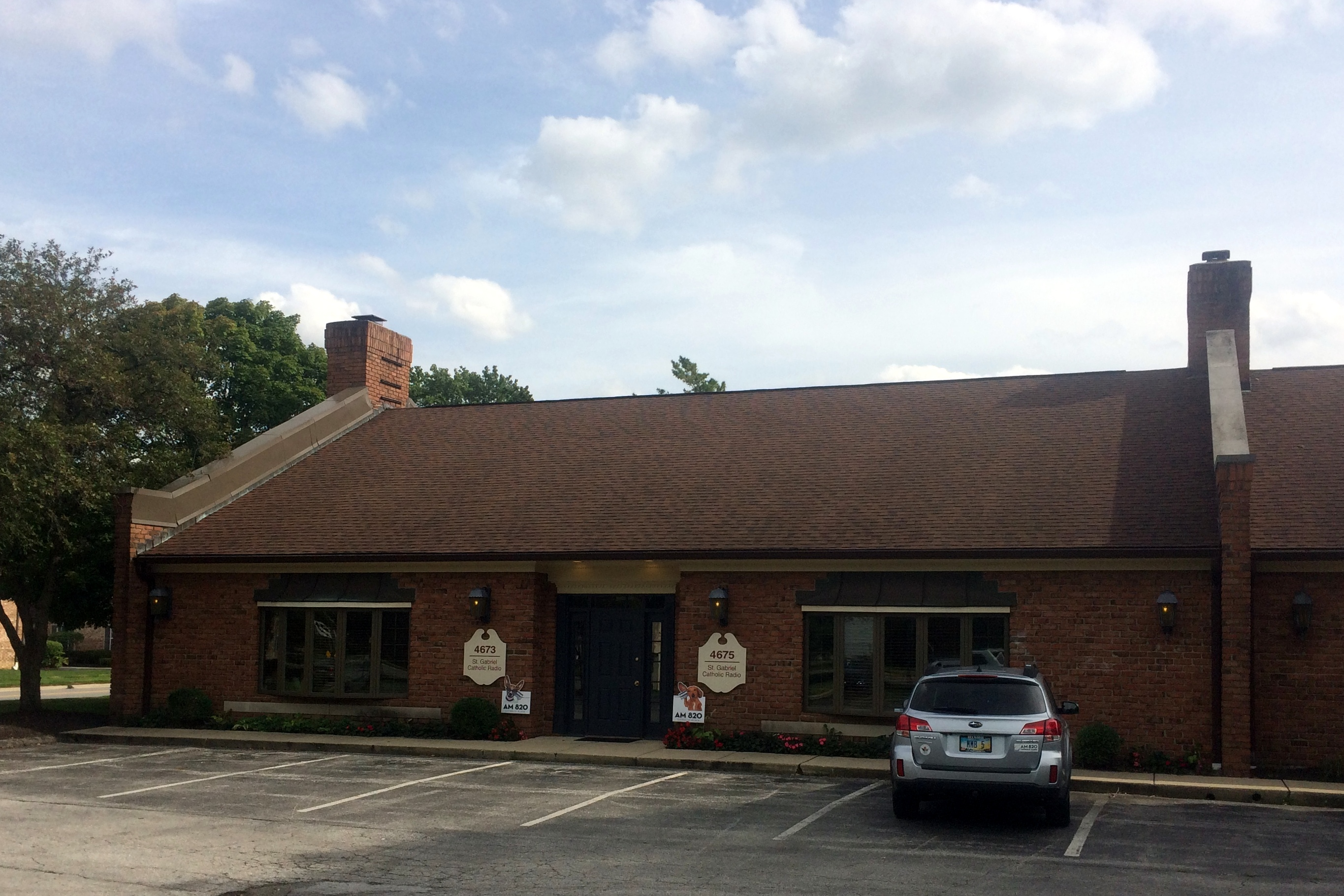
St. Gabriel Radio office and studio

== Catholic media ==
=== Radio ===
There are two stations in the diocese listed below, including:

- WFOT at 89.5 FM licensed to Lexington and serving the Mansfield area. Annunciation Radio airs programming from EWTN Global Catholic Radio. WFOT broadcasts as a simulcast of WNOC.
- WVSG 820 AM Saint Gabriel Radio (the former WOSU (AM))

There are two other stations also reaching the diocese listed below, including:

- WNOP "Sacred Heart Radio" 740 AM licensed to Newport, Kentucky and based in Cincinnati which also airs local and EWTN programming. WNOP also simulcasts on WPFB 910 AM in Middletown.
- WULM "Radio Maria" 1600 AM in Springfield Radio Maria USA is based at originating station KJMJ 580 AM in Alexandria, Louisiana.

=== Newspaper ===
The Catholic Columbian was the first official newspaper of the diocese, created in 1875 by Bishop Sylvester Rosecrans and Father Dennis Clarke. In 1939, the newspaper announced it would no longer associate with the diocese, but continued to publish until 1940, when it was replaced by The Columbus Register. In 1951, the diocese established The Catholic Times, to replace The Columbus Register; it continues publication today. In 2026, the newspaper was moved to an all-digital format.

== Clergy abuse scandal ==
In 1993, Bishop Griffin removed Phillip Jacobs from his parish due to allegations that he had sexually abused a teenage boy. The teenager’s family requested that the police not be notified, but years later Griffin made the notification. When the Diocese of Victoria in British Columbia was considering hiring Jacobs, Griffin informed the diocese about the allegations against him. The Diocese of Victoria hired Jacobs anyway. In 2010, Jacobs was arrested in Victoria, British Columbia for sexual abuse of minors. Jacobs was convicted in 2013 and sentenced to five months of home detention.

In August 2018, Bishop Campbell and the diocese were named in a $2 million lawsuit by Kevin Heidtman, a former student at St. Charles Preparatory School in Columbus. Heidtman stated that he was sexually abused on at least six occasions at the school by the priest Thomas Bennett between 2002 and 2003. Bennett died in 2008. The lawsuit alleged that Campbell and the diocese became aware of the priest's molesting Heidtman, but failed to take any action.

In March 2019, the diocese released a list of 36 clergy with credible accusations of sexual abuse of children, and updated the list to number nearly 50 in September of that year. In August 2020, the diocese paid a $1 million settlement to Heidtman. The diocese had previously resisted calls to release its files of abuse allegations.

Until 2020, the diocese was one of three dioceses in the nation to have a priest serve as victim assistance coordinator. Victim advocates criticized this practice, saying it can re-traumatize survivors and discourage the reporting of abuse. The diocese hired an outside licensed counselor in July 2020, coinciding with the formation of a Safe Environment Task Force by Bishop Brennan. In August 2024 John Denzel, the safe environment coordinator for St. Brigid of Kildare School in Dublin, was dismissed from that position after being arrested on child pornography charges.
