= Saint Patrick Church (Columbus, Ohio) =

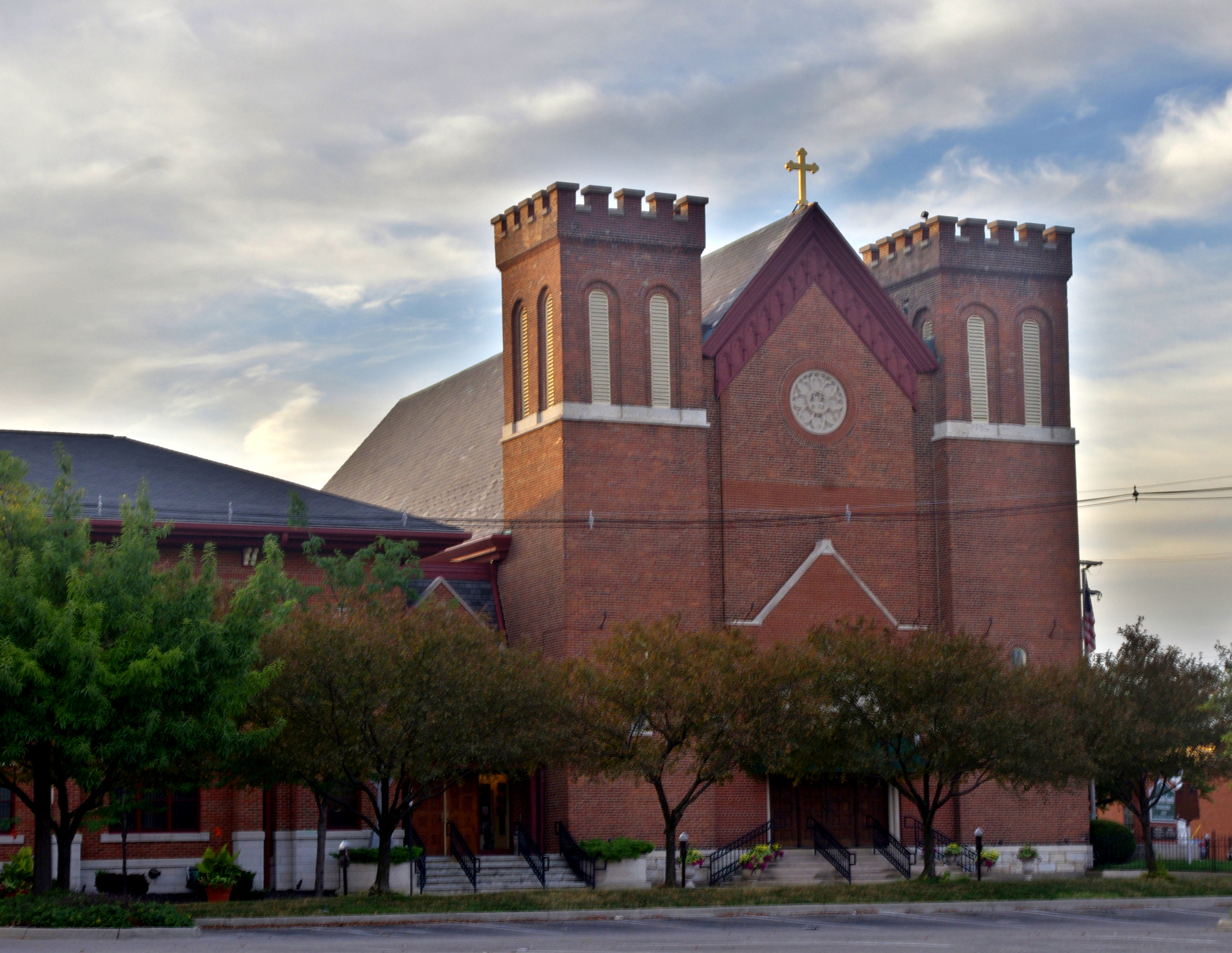
- Saint Patrick Church and parish center
- Saint Patrick Church
- 39.969016°N 82.991732°W
- Location: 280 N. Grant Avenue, Columbus, Ohio
- Country: United States
- Denomination: Roman Catholic
- Website: www.stpatrickcolumbus.org

History
- Founded: February 1851
- Dedicated: September 25, 1853
- Events: Cathedral of the Diocese of Columbus (1867–1872)

Architecture
- Functional status: Active
- Style: Norman Gothic
- Groundbreaking: September 5, 1852
- Completed: 1853

Administration
- Diocese: Roman Catholic Diocese of Columbus

Clergy
- Pastor(s): Fr. Paul Marich, O.P.

Saint Patrick Church is a historic building and the second-oldest Catholic church building in Columbus, Ohio. Located in the Discovery District neighborhood, the structure served as the pro-cathedral of the Roman Catholic Diocese of Columbus until the consecration of Saint Joseph Cathedral. It has been served by priests of the Dominican Order since 1885 and is currently home to an active parish.

== History ==
When Irish Catholic immigrants arrived in Columbus in 1848 to escape the Great Famine, the only Catholic church in the city was Holy Cross Church, a predominantly German Catholic parish. The German and Irish worshippers shared Holy Cross until 1850, when the parish voted to split. Archbishop Purcell of Cincinnati approved the new parish February 1851 and appointed Reverend John Furlong as its pastor. The lot on which the church stands was purchased from Robert E. Neill for $1000.

The new parish was named for Ireland's patron saint, Saint Patrick. The site chosen was on the west side of town at the corner of Grant and Naghten Streets (then known as the "Irish Broadway"). English-speaking worshipers continued attending Holy Cross during construction, with $1,200 toward the building fund donated by Holy Cross parishioners. it was the first Catholic church in Columbus to have a bell, which was acquired in around 1865.

=== Aquinas High School ===
in 1905, bishop James Hartley requested that the Dominican Fathers open a high school. Initially called St. Patrick High School and housed in the parochial school building at the corner of Grant and Mt. Vernon, it was renamed Aquinas High School and relocated to a dedicated building in 1912. It was the largest high school in the Diocese into the mid-20th century, until the need for new facilities and lack of personnel due to the Vatican asking for more of the Dominican Fathers to enter missionary work resulted in the announcing of the closure of the school in 1962. The final class graduated in 1965 and the school building was sold to the Columbus Board of Education. It is currently used by Columbus State Community College.

== Notable clergy ==
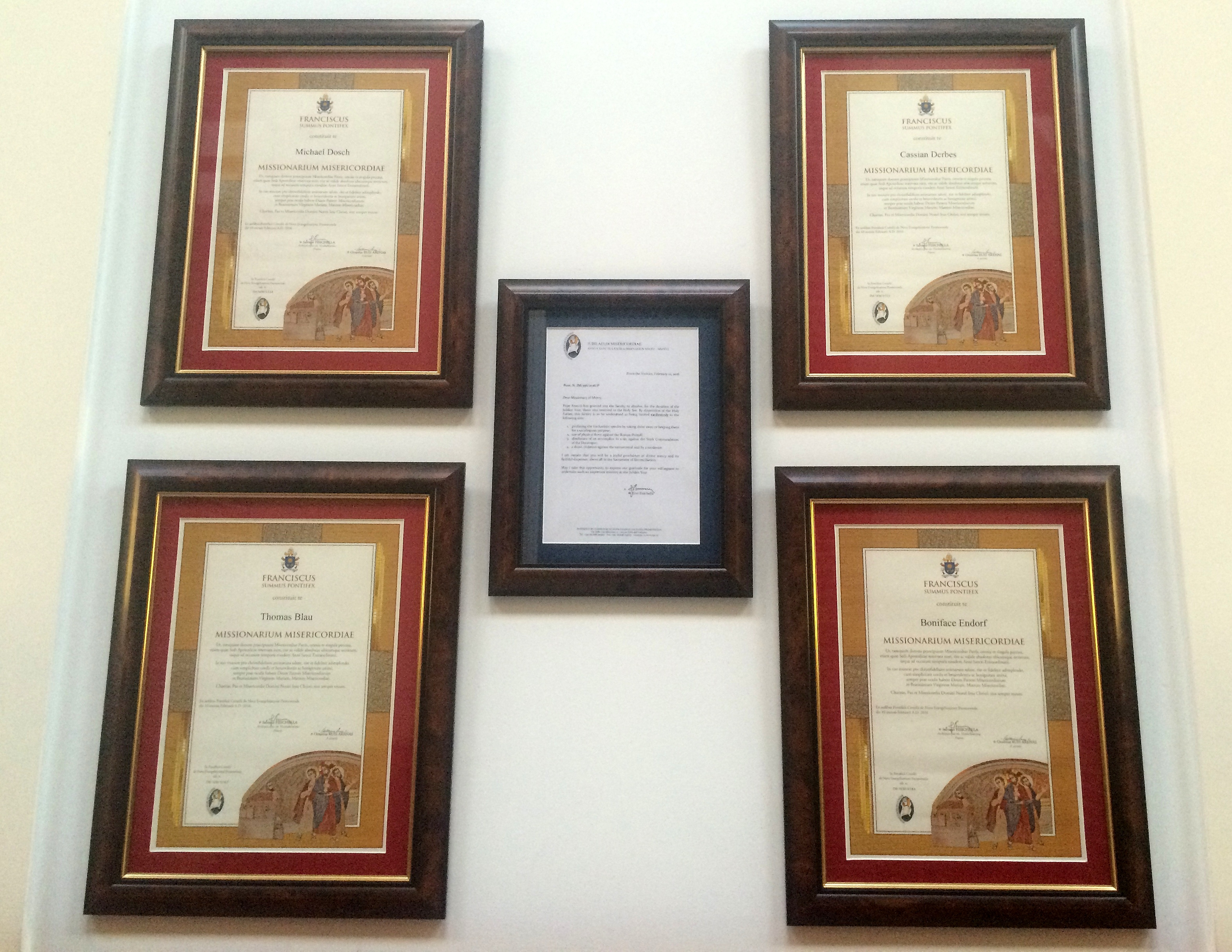
Missionary of Mercy certificates posted in the church hall

Notable Clergyman	Office / Appointment
Sylvester Horton Rosecrans	Bishop of Columbus (1868–1878)
Edward Fitzgerald	Bishop of Little Rock (1822–1832)
Nicolaus Aloysius Gallagher	Bishop of Galveston (1882–1918)
Michael Dosch	Missionary of Mercy (2015–2016)
Cassian Derbes	Missionary of Mercy (2015–2016)
Thomas Blau	Missionary of Mercy (2015–2016)
Boniface Endorf	Missionary of Mercy (2015–2016)

== Interior ==
=== Stained glass windows ===
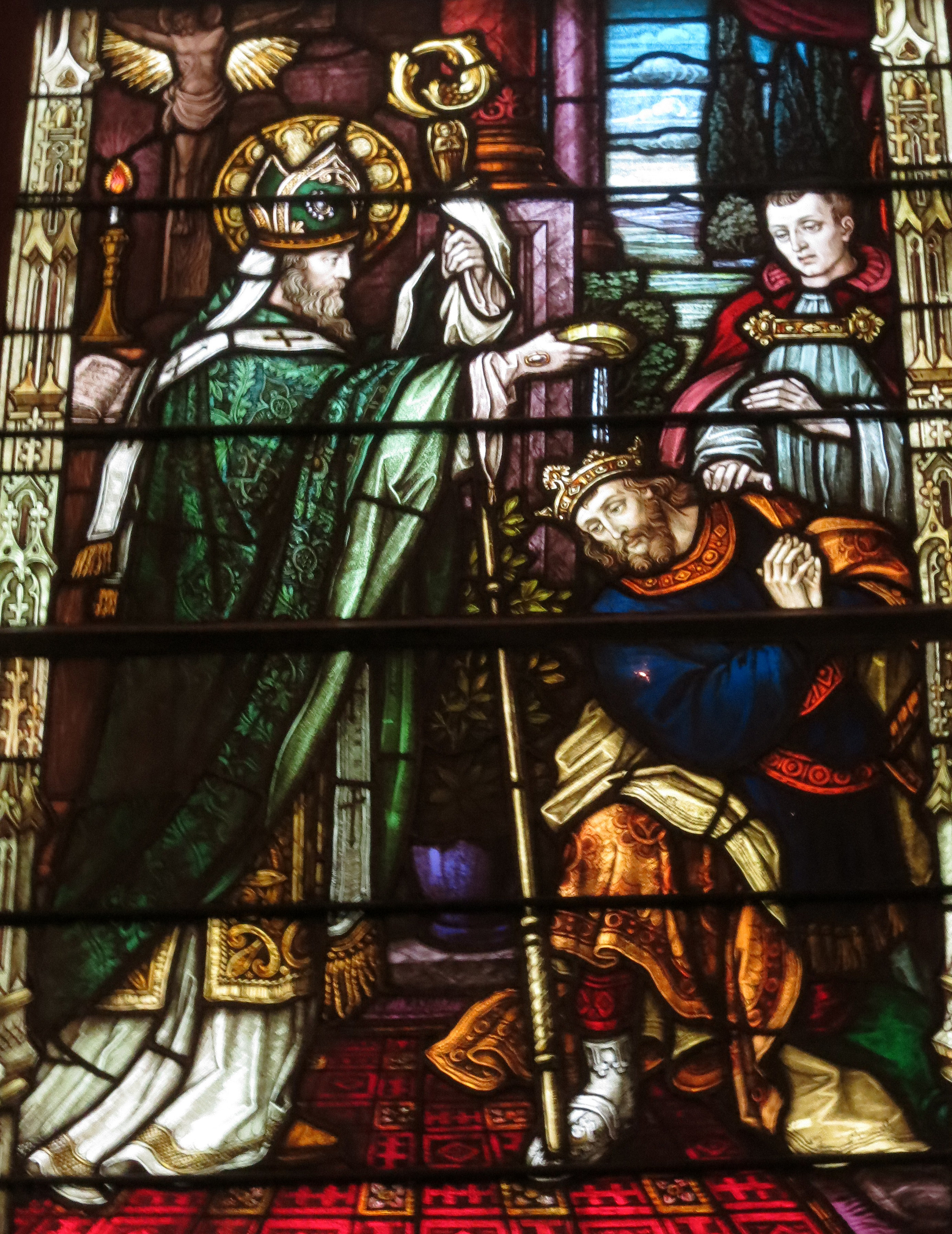
The church's window depicting Saint Patrick baptizing the King of Ireland

Subjects of stained glass windows as arranged from east to west
North Side	South Side
Apse
Saint Dominic receiving the Rosary from the Virgin Mary	Saint Patrick explaining the Trinity
Nave
The Last Supper	The Presentation of Jesus at the Temple
The Annunciation	The Resurrection of Jesus
Sacred Heart of Jesus appearing to St. Margaret Mary	Death of Saint Joseph
The Marriage at Cana	The Anointing of Jesus
Saint Patrick's baptism of the High King of Ireland	Jesus on a crucifix speaking to Saint Thomas Aquinas
non-pictorial window over a door	Saints Vincent de Paul and Anthony of Padua

=== Paintings ===
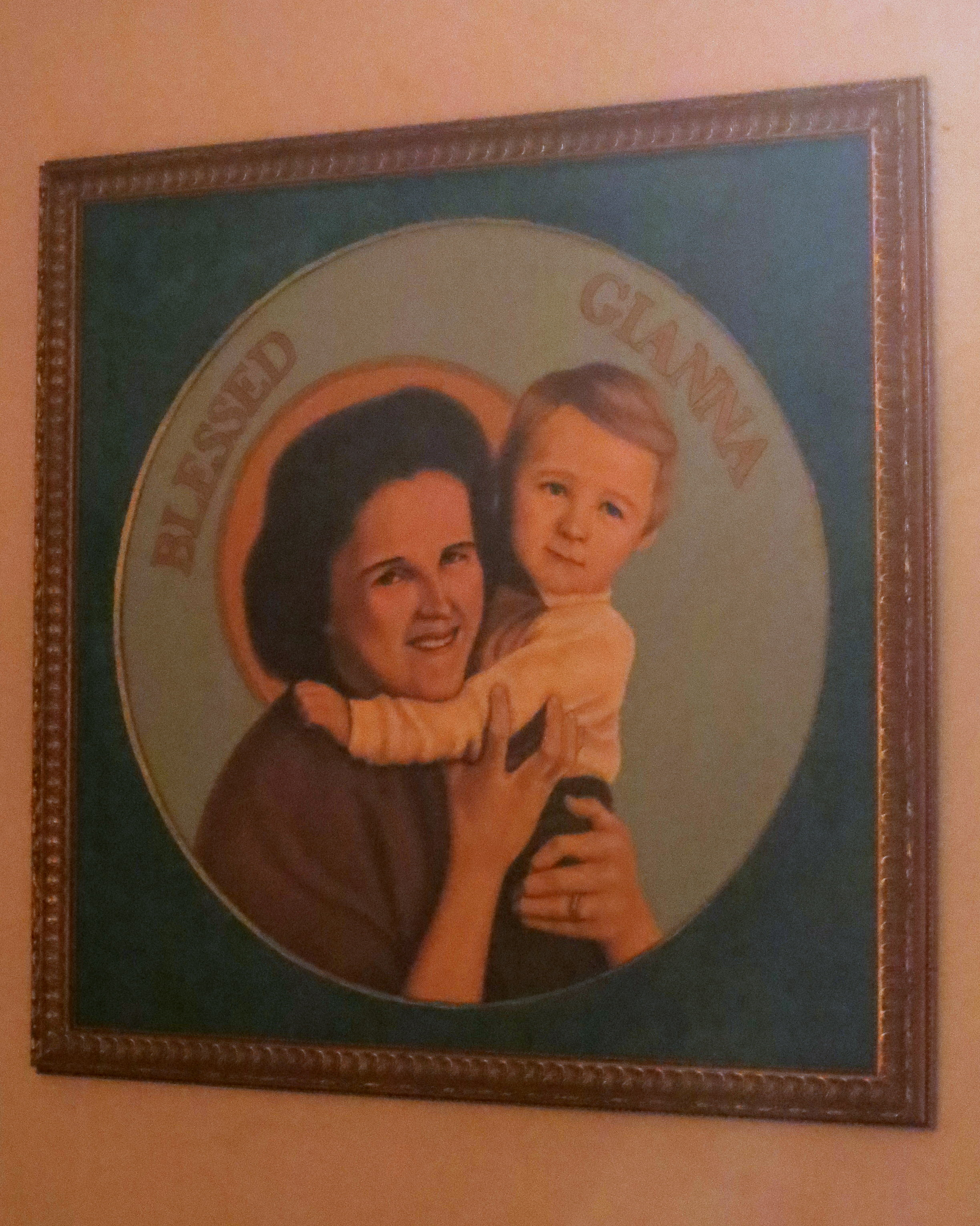
A medallion depicting St. Gianna Beretta Molla (a lay Dominican) and her child.

There is a fresco of a medallion depicting a Dominican saint over each stained glass window in the nave.

Subjects of the medallion frescos as arranged from east to west
North Side	South Side
Saint Thomas Aquinas	Saint Dominic
Saint Catherine of Siena	Saint Rose of Lima
Saint Antoninus	Pope Saint Pius V
Saint Agnes	Saint Catherine de Ricci
Saint Vincent Ferrer	Saint Hyacinth
Blessed Pier Giorgio Frassati	Saint Gianna Beretta Molla
