= Bishop Rosecrans High School =

Location
- 1040 East Main Street; Zanesville, (Muskingum County), Ohio 43701; USA
- Coordinates: 39°56′21″N 81°59′51″W

Information
- School type: Private, Coeducational
- Motto: Mors Christi Vita Mea (Through Christ's Death, We Live)
- Religious affiliation: Roman Catholic
- Patron saint: Our Lady of the Rosary
- Established: 1950
- Founder: Msgr. Linus Dury and Fr. C.M. Mulvey, O.P.
- Oversight: Diocese of Columbus
- CEEB code: 365750
- Grades: 9–12
- Colors: Red and Black
- Athletics conference: Mid-State League - Cardinal
- Team name: Bishops
- Rival: William V. Fisher Catholic High School
- Newspaper: The Evangelist
- Yearbook: Crosier
- Website: www.bishop-rosecrans.com

Bishop Rosecrans High School is a private, Catholic high school, operated by the Roman Catholic Diocese of Columbus, located in Zanesville, in the U.S. state of Ohio. The school's athletic teams are known as the Bishops.

== School history ==
Founded in 1950 as a designed merger of the former St. Thomas Aquinas High School and St. Nicholas High School, the school moved into the structure formerly occupied by St. Nicholas HS. The name was selected to honor the first bishop of Columbus, Sylvester Horton Rosecrans, and to this day the coats of arms of various Columbus bishops appear on the edifice of the current building.

The history of Catholic education in Zanesville traces its history to the year 1830 when St. Thomas Aquinas Parish was established by members of the Order of Preachers (Dominicans). In 1842 St. Nicholas Parish was established by German immigrants and a parish school was also opened. By 1853 the Dominican Sisters of St. Mary of the Springs (Columbus, OH) established a female academy, which would remain open until 1873 when the sisters took over as the teachers and administrators of St. Thomas Parish School. The program at St. Thomas was expanded to include secondary courses between 1884 and 1914. In 1893 the Franciscan Sisters of Christian Charity (Manitowoc, Wisconsin) arrived at St. Nicholas and by 1921 they had also established a complete secondary program. In 1927 St. Nicholas High School built a permanent building, it would be in this building that Bishop Rosecrans High School would be formed and have its first classes. In 1963, after the founding of the new consolidated high school, Albert and Cora Rogge gave money for the Catholic Youth Center which soon became the new home of the high school. Subsequent construction to enlarge the facility occurred in 1970 and 1971, and was dedicated May 23, 1971. At one time, the high school's faculty was simultaneously served by priests of the Columbus Diocese, Dominican priests and brothers, the Manitowoc Franciscans, and the Dominican Sisters of St. Mary of the Springs. Today, the high school has a dedicated lay faculty. The Bishop Rosecrans Foundation was formed in 1986 to further the mission of Catholic secondary education in the region. For the current academic year the school has 146 students in grades 9-12 and well over 3,300 alumni.

== Student organizations ==
Bishop Rosecrans offers a wide range of non-athletic extracurricular opportunities including: Key Club, Pep Club, Campus Ministry, Mock Trial, Student Council, Quiz Team, Drama Club, National Honor Society.

== Athletics ==
Currently the school offers its students the option to participate football, soccer (boys and girls), golf (boys' and girls'), volleyball (girls'), and tennis (girls') in the fall; basketball (girls' and boys') and swimming (girls' and boys') in the winters; and baseball, softball, tennis (boys'), and track (boys' and girls') in the spring.

In 2017 a football field and stands were built behind the school; a first in the schools history. The opening game being an 81–8 victory over Beallsville High School.

More information about current Rosecrans Sports can be found at this highschoolsports.net site.

The school has achieved Ohio High School Athletic Association State Championships in:

- Boys' Golf – 1986, 1988
- Girls' Cross Country – 1983
- Girls' Track and Field – 1981, 1983, 1984
- Girls' Basketball – 1982, 1983, 1992

== Notable alumni ==
- Richard Basehart - Graduate of the former St. Thomas Aquinas High School.
- Mary Aquinas Kinskey - Attended the former St. Nicholas High School. An expert in aerodynamics and aviation during the Second World War. She was a member of the Franciscan Sisters of Christian Charity.
