= Edward Fenwick =

American Catholic bishop (1768–1832)

His Excellency, The Right Reverend Edward Dominic Fenwick O.P.
- Bishop of Cincinnati
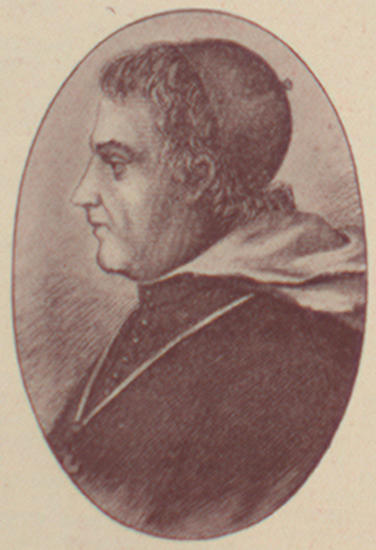
- Diocese: Cincinnati
- Appointed: 19 June 1821
- In office: 1822–1833
- Successor: John Baptist Purcell

Orders
- Ordination: February 23, 1793 by Ferdinand-Marie de Lobkowitz
- Consecration: January 13, 1822 by Benedict Joseph Flaget

Personal details
- Born: August 19, 1768 Province of Maryland, British America
- Died: September 26, 1832 (aged 64) Wooster, Ohio, United States
- Coat of arms

Edward Dominic Fenwick, O.P. (August 19, 1768 – September 26, 1832) was an American prelate of the Catholic Church, a Dominican priest and the first bishop of Cincinnati in Ohio. Fenwick established the first Catholic churches in both Kentucky and Ohio along with the first Dominican province in the United States.

== Early life ==
Edward Fenwick was born on August 19, 1768, on the family plantation on the Patuxent River, in the British Province of Maryland, to Colonel Ignatius Fenwick and Sarah Taney. Colonel Fenwick later became a military officer during the American Revolution. The Fenwicks were one of the early Catholic families of Maryland, the starting point of Catholicism in the American colonies.

During the mid-1700's, the Society of Jesus served the Catholic families in the province and some family members joined the order. Edward's first cousin, Benedict J. Fenwick, a Jesuit priest, later became the second bishop of Boston; another cousin, Enoch Fenwick also a Jesuit priest, later became president of Georgetown College.

As there were no Catholic institutions of learning in the American colonies, many wealthy Catholic families sent their sons abroad to study. The Fenwick family sent 15-year-old Edward to the Dominican Holy Cross College in Bornem, near Antwerp in what was then the Austrian Netherlands. Edward's uncle was a teacher there. The school was under the jurisdiction of the English Province of Dominicans.In 1788, Fenwick joined the Dominican Order and entered their seminary at Bornem as a theological student, choosing the name, "Dominic". He took his solemn vows to the Dominicans in March 1790.

== Priesthood ==
Edward Dominic Fenwick was ordained a priest in Ghent, Belgium. for the Dominical Order on February 23, 1793 by Bishop Ferdinand-Marie de Lobkowitz. After his ordination, the Dominicans assigned Fenwick as a professor at the Dominican College. The next year, the French First Republic took over the Austrian Netherlands after defeating the Hapsburg Empire in battle. The French occupation forces imposed restrictions on the Catholic church and its priests. Fenwick was imprisoned, but was released after providing proof of his American citizenship. The Dominicans relocated their college to Carshalton, England and Fenwick left with them. Later, Fenwick taught at a Dominican school outside London.

With the assistance of Luke Concanen, assistant to the Master of the Dominican Order, Fenwick received permission from the Dominican Order to return to what was now the United States and establish a Dominican college there. He arrived in Baltimore, Maryland, in the autumn of 1804, accompanied by Brother Robert Angier. Fenwick was received by Bishop John Carroll. Carroll was bishop of the Diocese of Baltimore, which then covered the entire small Catholic population in the United States. He suggested that Fenwick and his fellow Dominicans should evangelize the new states and territories west of the Appalachian Mountains.

== Missionary work ==
In 1805, Fenwick traversed the entire Mississippi Valley, looking for a central location to serve as a headquarters for his missionary work. He was accompanied by Angier, Reverend Samuel Thomas Wilson and Reverend William Raymond Tuite.Fenwick decided in 1806 to purchase a 500-acre plantation near Springfield, Kentucky. At that time, Kentucky had a small Catholic population that had migrated there during the late 18th century from Maryland. To help build this venture, Fenwick sold some enslaved African-Americans he owned at the family plantation in Maryland. He use the sale proceeds to purchase enslaved people in Kentucky, who he used to help build his community.

Fenwick began construction of a priory and a church almost immediately; the buildings were first inhabited in December 1806, but not completed until 1807. Saint Rose Priory was named for Rose of Lima, a Peruvian sister who was the first native of the Americas to be canonized. In February 1807, the Dominican Order approved the erection of the new American Province of Saint Joseph. At Fenwick's request, Wilson was appointed prior.

As an itinerant preacher visiting Catholic families in Kentucky, Kenwick faced many difficulties. He frequently had to swim his horse across swollen streams to reach a mission. On occasion, Fenwick camped out in the forests, which were then populated by bears and wolves. Like other missionaries, he faced the strain of loneliness and health problems caused by overwork and exposure to the weather. While riding from place to place, Fenwick prayed his Breviary, often fasting in anticipation of celebrating Mass once he reached his destination. He would ride forty miles out of his way to visit an isolated family.

In 1808, Fenwick moved on to Ohio, where he ministered to Irish and German families, many of the latter knowing little English. In Kentucky, the Saint Rose of Lima Church was dedicated on December 25, 1809, and the Saint Rose Priory became the first Catholic educational institution west of the Allegheny Mountains. In 1817, Fenwick was joined in Ohio by his newly ordained nephew, Reverend Nicholas Dominic Young, OP. The two priests built Saint Joseph's Church in Somerset, the first Catholic church in Ohio, on December 6, 1818. A second log church, dedicated to the Blessed Virgin Mary, was soon erected in Lancaster. A third was begun in Cincinnati, at the suggestion of Bishop Flaget, who visited the city in the spring of 1818.

== Bishop of Cincinnati ==
On June 19, 1821, Pope Pius VII named Fenwick as the first bishop of the new Diocese of Cincinnati. He was consecrated on January 13, 1822, at Saint Rose of Lima Church in Kentucky by Bishop Benedict Joseph Flaget of the Diocese of Bardstown. In 1823, Fenwick went to Europe in 1823 to raise money for the new diocese. He petitioned Father Master Pio Maurizio Viviani, pro-general of the Dominicans in Rome, to relocate the Dominican Province from Kentucky to Ohio. Fenwick said that Ohio had good cheap agricultural land and was a free state that had banned slavery. He also asked Viviani to send him Dominican lay brothers.

Fenwick returned to Cincinnati in 1826 with resources to begin the construction of cathedral and parochial schools. To staff the schools, he founded convents in Cincinnati for the Sisters of Charity and the Dominicans of Saint Catharine, the first in the United States for Dominican religious sisters.In 1826, Fenwick dedicated Saint Peter's Cathedral, the first cathedral in Cincinnati. In 1829, Fenwick established the Saint Francis Xavier Seminary in Cincinnati. This was the third oldest Catholic seminary in the United States and the oldest Catholic seminary west of the Appalachian Mountains. The Athenaeum of Ohio-Mount Saint Mary Seminary claims its roots through the Saint Francis Xavier Seminary and is located in Cincinnati In her book Domestic Manners of the Americans, Fanny Trollope wrote of Fenwick:

I had the pleasure of being introduced to the Catholic bishop of Cincinnati, and have never known in any country a priest of a character and bearing more truly apostolic. He was an American, but I should never have discovered it from his pronunciation or manner. He received his education partly in England, and partly in France. His manners were highly polished; his piety active and sincere, and infinitely more mild and tolerant than that of the factious Sectarians who form the great majority of the American priesthood.

In 1831, Fenwick initiated publication of The Catholic Telegraph, the newspaper for the diocese. The weekly newspaper was carried by stage and riverboat within the diocese and to cities in Kentucky, Missouri, Pennsylvania, Maryland and the District of Columbia. The Catholic Telegraph is the oldest continuously published Catholic newspaper in the United States. Also in 1831, Fenwick founded The Athenaeum, which later evolved into Xavier University and Saint Xavier High School. After 1831, Fenwick returned to missionary work, visiting Native American tribes in the American Midwest.

== Death ==
Stricken by cholera, Fenwick died in Wooster, Ohio, on September 26, 1832, at age 64. He is buried in a mausoleum in the Saint Joseph Cemetery in Delhi Township, Ohio.

== Legacy ==
Several schools are named in his honor:

- Bishop Fenwick High School, Franklin Township, Ohio
- Fenwick High School, Oak Park, Illinois
- Fenwick High School, Lancaster, Ohio (now the William V. Fisher Catholic High School)
- Bishop Fenwick Middle School, Zanesville, Ohio

== Notes ==
Catholic Church titles
Preceded by None	Bishop of Cincinnati; 1822–1833	Succeeded by John Baptist Purcell
