= Saint Joseph's Catholic Church (Somerset, Ohio) =

Historic church in Ohio, United States

- U.S. National Register of Historic Places
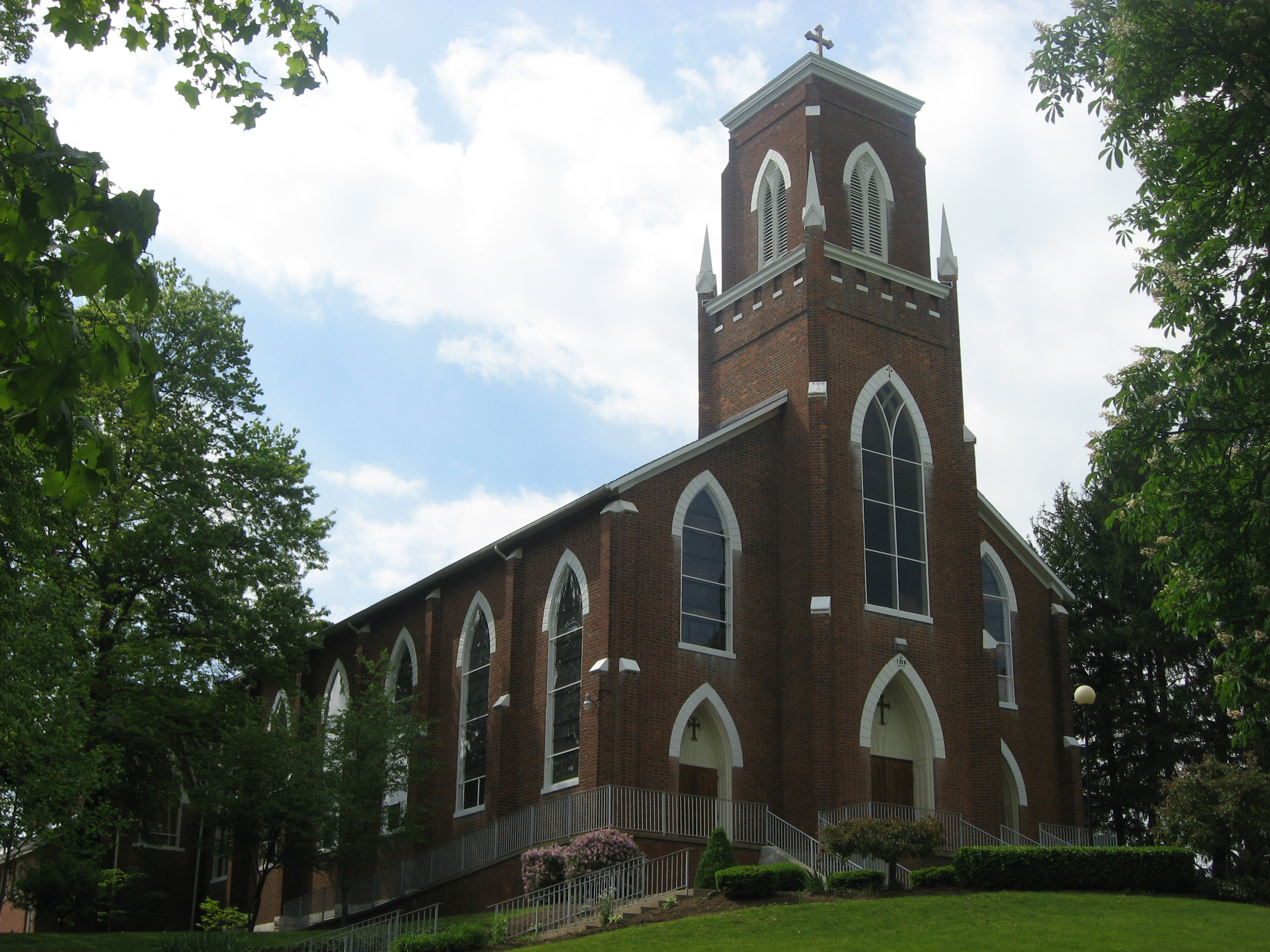

- Location within Ohio Location within the United States
- Nearest city: Somerset, Ohio
- Coordinates: 39°46′38″N 82°16′38″W
- Area: 7.6 acres (3.1 ha)
- Built: 1843
- Architect: Thomas Spare
- Architectural style: Gothic, High Victorian Revival
- NRHP reference No.: 86002267
- Added to NRHP: August 7, 1986

Saint Joseph's Catholic Church is a historic church in the Roman Catholic Diocese of Columbus, located in Somerset, Ohio. It is one of the oldest Catholic church buildings in Ohio and home to Ohio's oldest Catholic parish which has been served by priests of the Dominican order since its foundation. Built in 1843, it was added to the National Register of Historic Places in 1986.

== History ==
In approximately 1798, Jacob Dittoe, a German-Catholic pioneer, moved to the Ohio wilderness in the area near modern-day Somerset. About seven years later, Dittoe began petitioning Bishop Carroll of Baltimore (the only Catholic bishop in the United States at the time) to send priests to his growing Catholic community. In a letter dated Feb. 1, 1808, Dittoe informed the bishop of the locals' needs for the Sacraments, and asked if a Catholic lawyer could validate marriages in the absence of a priest. Apparently, this letter moved the bishop to act. He sent a Dominican priest, Father Edward Fenwick from Kentucky to find Dittoe and serve the religious needs of his community.

Fenwick traveled from Kentucky to Ohio along Zane's Trace, and learned of Dittoe's whereabouts when he reached New Lancaster. Lost on the poorly marked road, Fenwick followed the sound of an ax cracking through the wilderness to reach the home of Jacob and Catherine Dittoe in September 1808. From that time forward, Fr. Fenwick attempted annual visits. One notable exception was in 1812 when Bishop Flaget of Bardstown and Father Stephen Badin lodged with the Dittoes en route to Baltimore. Of the occasion, Flaget wrote:

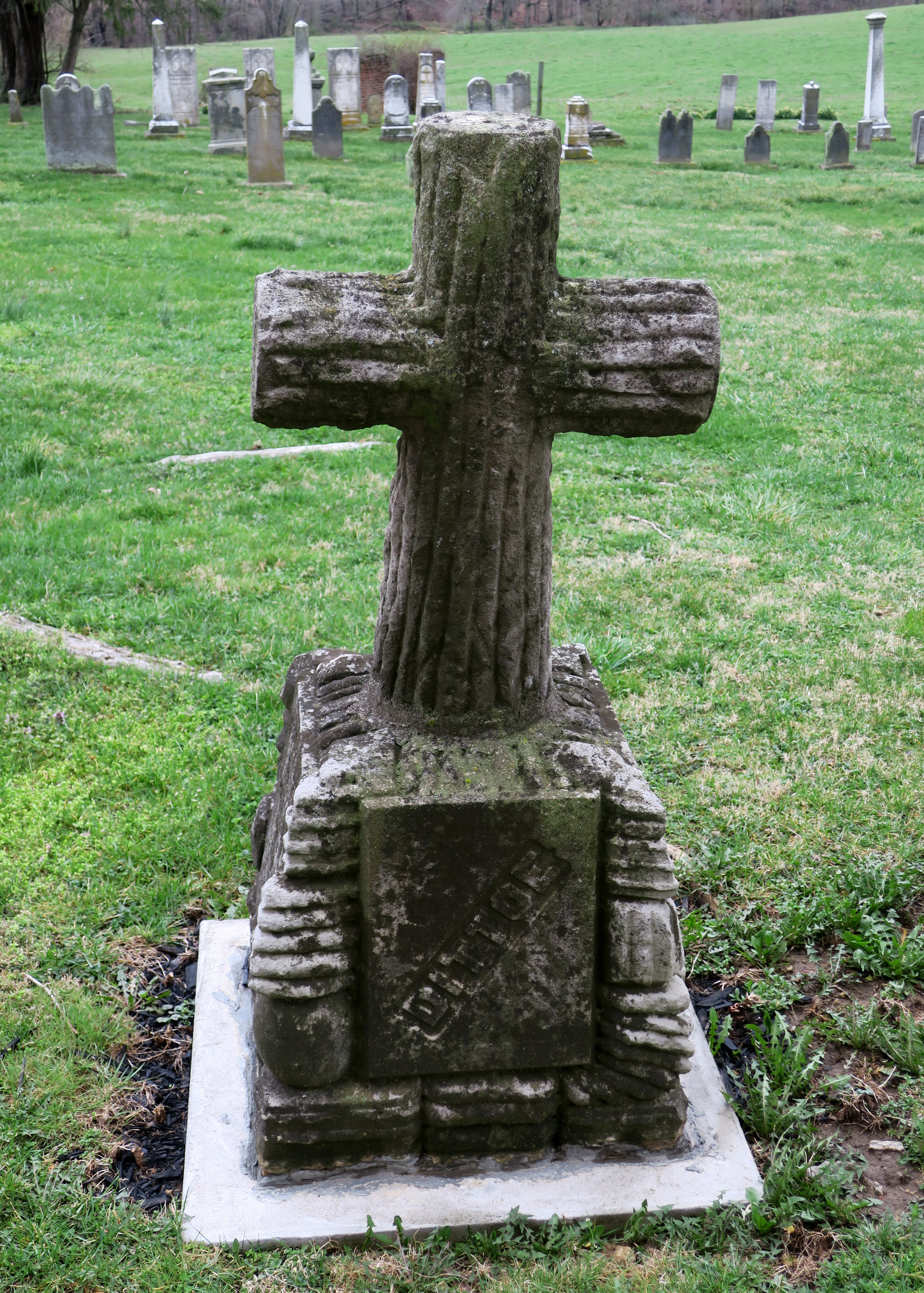
The Jacob Dittoe family grave at the church cemetery

We went to spend the night with Mr. Dittoe, an excellent Catholic who keeps an inn on the road. This faithful believer has already bought, conjointly with one of his brothers, 320 acres of land for the location of a priest. He has already built a little house on it and cleared ten acres. In three years, he hopes to have thirty acres cleared. I promised him that I would try to send them a priest, at least once a year until Providence would permit me to give them one permanently. I advised Mr. Dittoe to build a house which would be at the same time a house for the priest and a chapel, and he is going to do it. This chapel could also serve as a place where the Catholics might gather together every Sunday, thus serving to draw them closer in the bonds of charity, and reminding them of their duties as Catholics. The Catholics at New Lancaster, or near Mr. Dittoe's, are in sufficient numbers to form a very respectable congregation, and with the taste that the Germans have for music, I am very sure that divine services there would be held with a great deal of beauty and dignity. All the children of Mr. Dittoe are musicians, and at this moment while I am writing they are making a chorus of melody which pleases me very much. God of all goodness, send me priests!

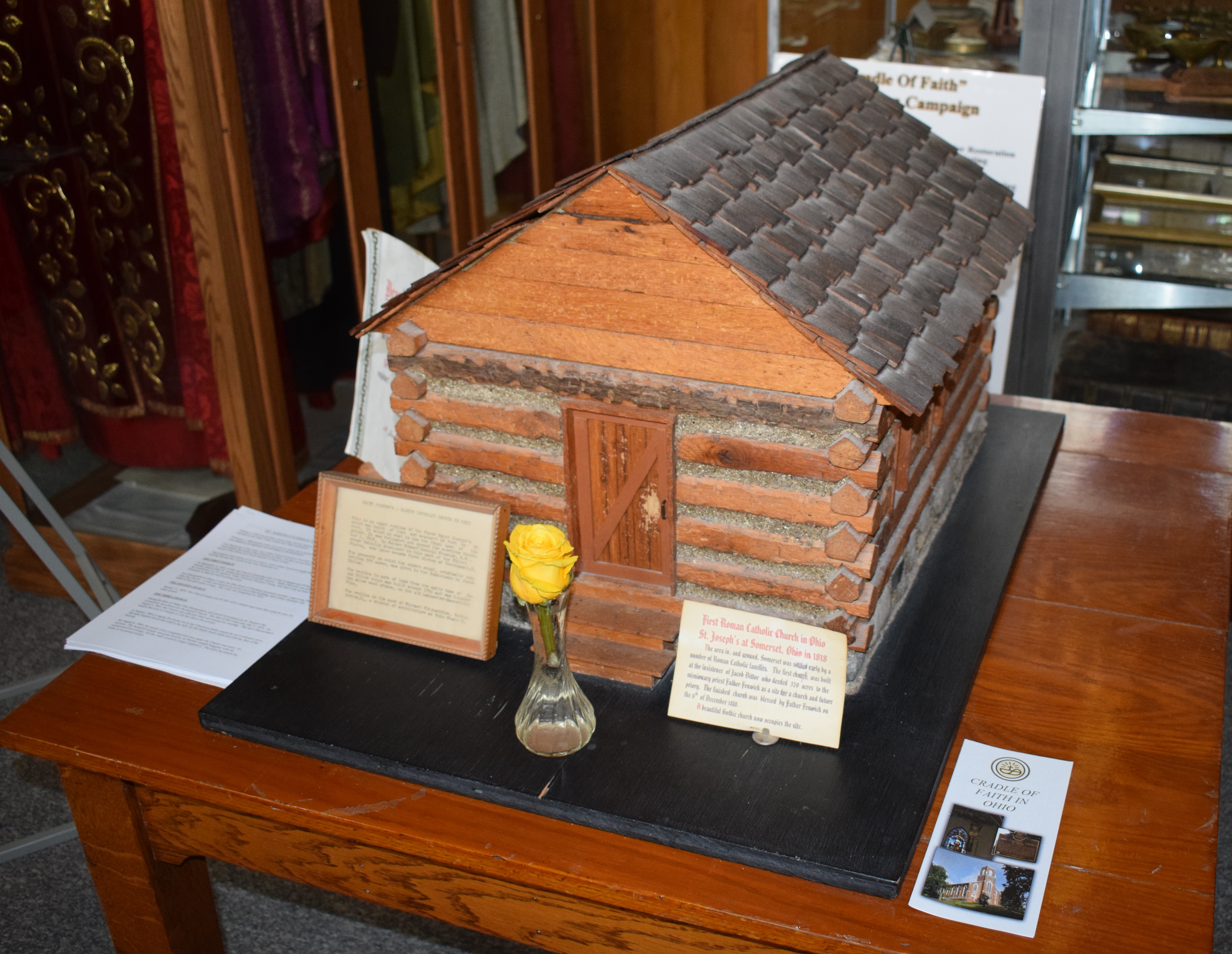
Model of the original log church building in the church museum

The 320 acres Flaget mentioned was eventually deeded to Fr. Fenwick as a site for a church and seminary. Bishop Flaget assigned Fr. Fenwick to Ohio as a full-time itinerant missionary in 1816. In 1818, Fenwick and his nephew, Fr. Nicholas Dominic Young, took up residence in a cabin Dittoe built as headquarters for the Ohio missions. Fr. Fenwick dedicated the original Saint Joseph Church on Dec. 6, 1818. A log structure measuring 22 feet long and 15 feet wide, it was the first Catholic church building in Ohio. Jacob Dittoe chose the parish patron saint. The first baptismal record at the new parish was that of Nicholas J. Ryan on Dec. 24, 1818. Conditions in the log church were harsh; winter temperatures dropped low enough that a brazier was used on the altar during Mass to keep the Communion wine from freezing.

Fenwick left St. Joseph Church in 1821 when he was appointed as bishop of the newly formed Diocese of Cincinnati. Fr. Young carried on alone until 1823 when Fr. Daniel O'Leary joined him at St. Joseph and remained with him there until the mid-1830s. During that time, the log church was replaced with a brick one; it was dedicated on Jan. 11, 1829. In time, this structure became too crowded, so construction on another church building began in 1839. Despite funding difficulties, the church (the current St. Joseph church building) was completed and dedicated in 1843. All but the walls was destroyed by fire in 1864, but the church was rebuilt. The interior was renovated in 2016.

== Notable Clergy ==
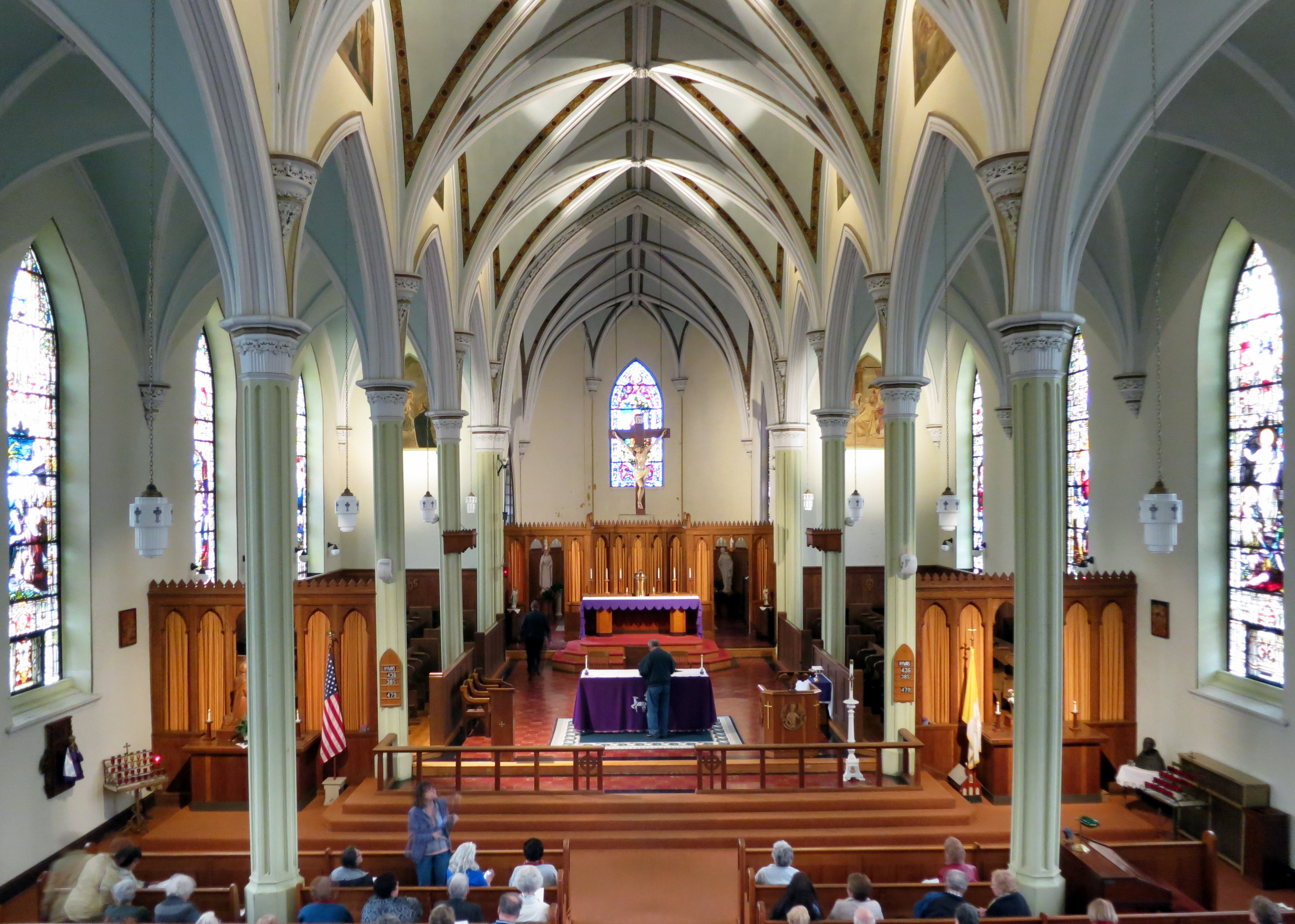
Interior

Notable Clergyman	Office / Appointment
Edward Dominic Fenwick	Bishop of Cincinnati (1822 - 1832)
Joseph Sadoc Alemany	Bishop of Monterey (1850 - 1853), Archbishop of San Francisco (1853 - 1884)

== Present day ==
St. Joseph's shares a pastor with Holy Trinity, also in Somerset.
