= Sylvester Horton Rosecrans =

Catholic bishop

His Excellency, The Right Reverend Sylvester Horton Rosecrans
- Bishop of Columbus; Titular Bishop of Pompeiopolis
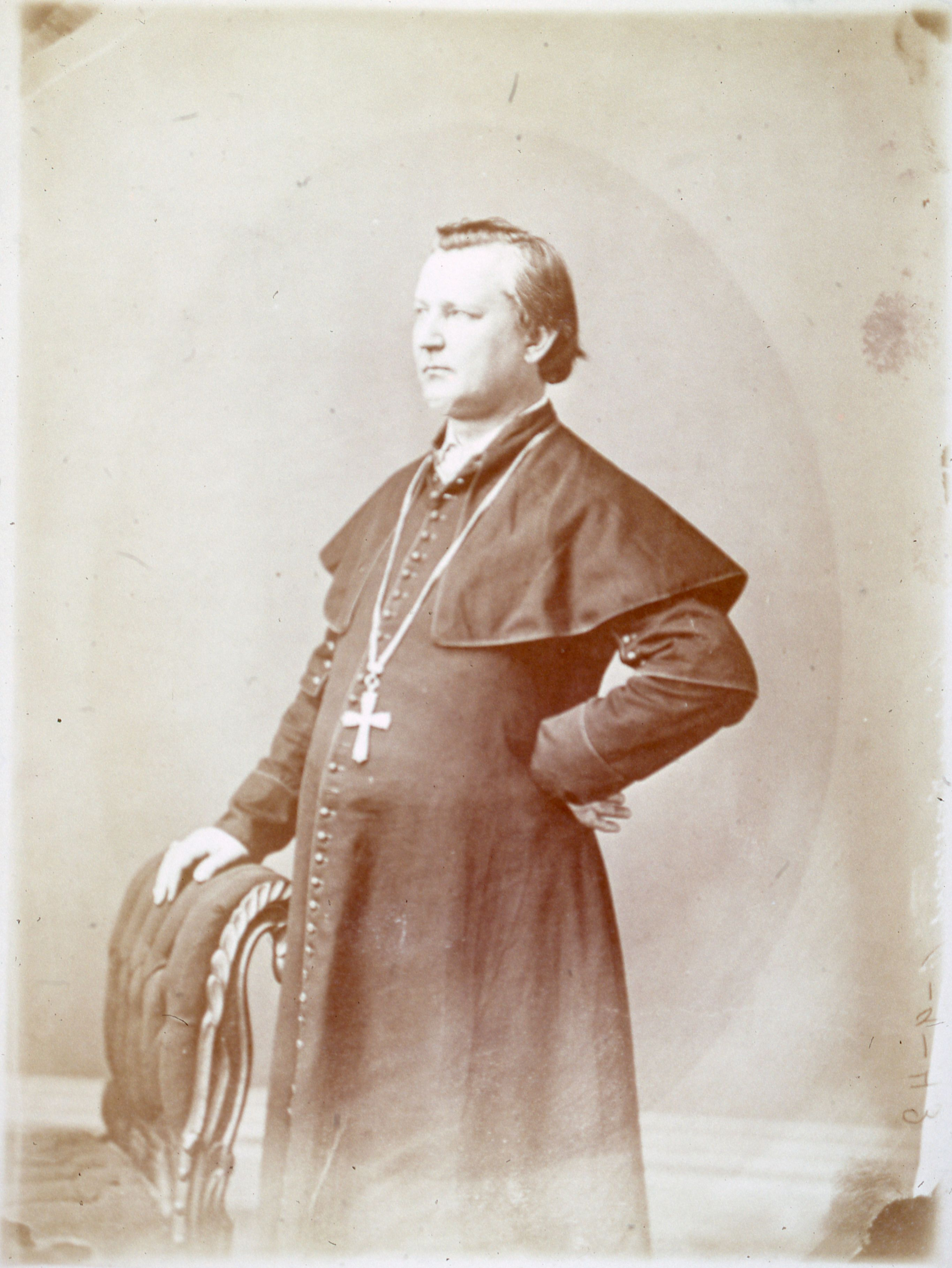
- Church: Roman Catholic Church
- See: Columbus
- In office: March 3, 1868 – October 21, 1878
- Successor: John Ambrose Watterson
- Previous post: Auxiliary Bishop of Cincinnati (1862–1868)

Orders
- Ordination: June 5, 1852 by Costantino Patrizi
- Consecration: March 25, 1862 by John Baptist Purcell, Martin John Spalding, John Luers

Personal details
- Born: February 5, 1827 Homer, Ohio, USA
- Died: October 21, 1878 (aged 51) Columbus, Ohio, USA
- Motto: Mors Christi vita mea (Christ's death is my life)

Sylvester Horton Rosecrans (February 5, 1827 – October 21, 1878) was an American prelate of the Roman Catholic Church. He served as bishop of the Diocese of Columbus in Ohio from 1868 until his death in 1878. He previously served as an auxiliary bishop of the Archdiocese of Cincinnati in Ohio from 1862 to 1868.

== Biography ==
=== Early life ===
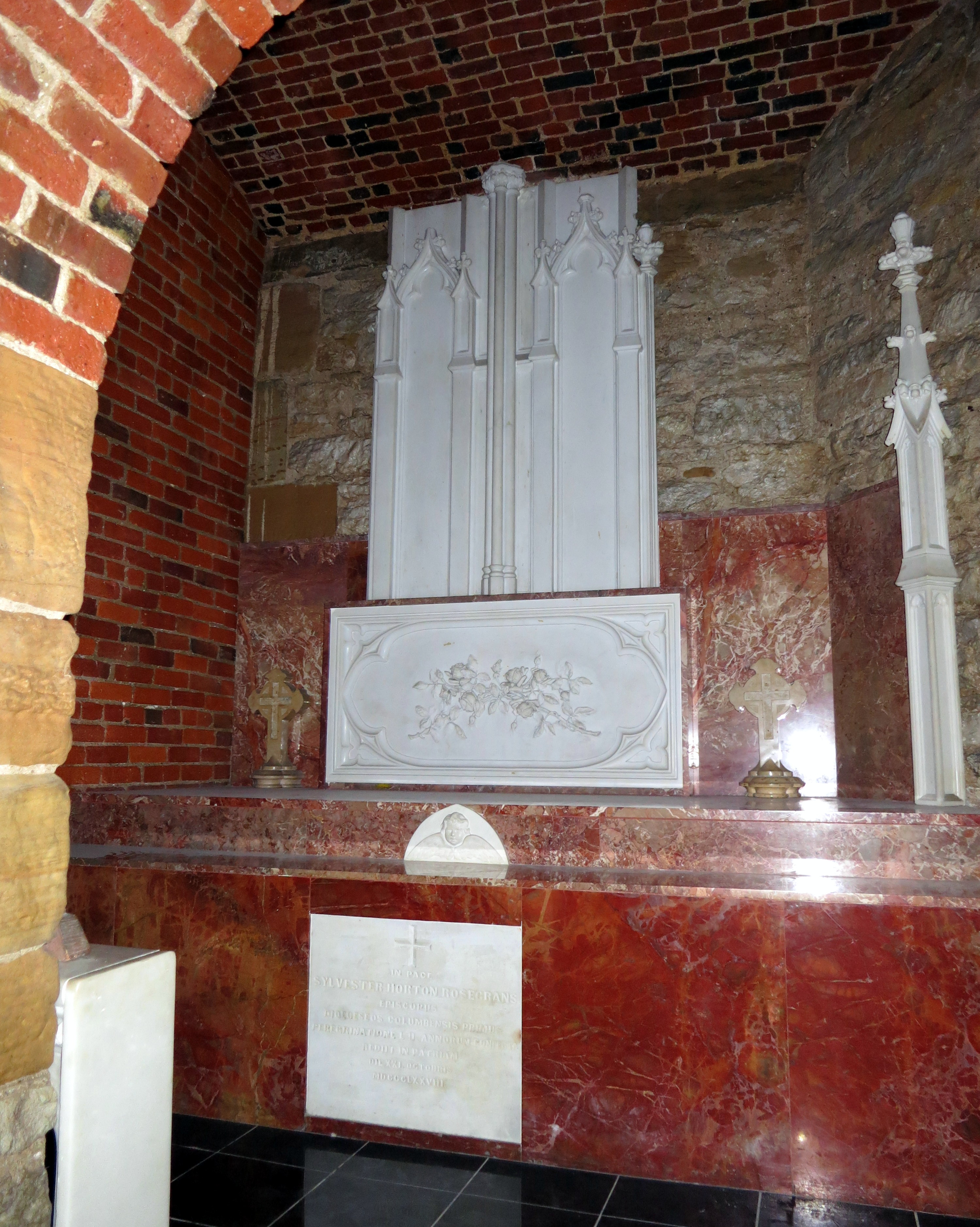
The tomb of Bishop Rosecrans in St. Joseph Cathedral (2015)

Sylvester Rosecrans was born on February 5, 1827, in Homer, Ohio, to Crandell and Jemima (née Hopkins) Rosecrans, the youngest of four sons. Crandell's family came from Amsterdam, Netherlands to Wilkes-Barre, Pennsylvania, then moved to Kingston Township, Ohio. Jane was the granddaughter of Stephen Hopkins, the Colonial Governor of Rhode Island, and grandniece of Esek Hopkins, the Commander-in-Chief of the Continental Navy during the American Revolutionary War. Sylvester Rosecrans' brother was General William Rosecrans of the Union Army, who fought in the American Civil War.

Raised in a Methodist family, Rosecrans spent his childhood in Licking County, Ohio, in the town of Homer. Crandall worked both as a farmer and as an engineer. While attending Kenyon College in Gambier, Ohio in 1845, he received a letter from William Rosecrans announcing his conversion to Catholicism. Influenced by his brother's conversion, Rosecrans converted to Catholicism that same year. He was ministered to by Reverend Jean-Baptiste Lamy while the latter was serving as a missionary priest in the area. After leaving Kenyon College, Rosecrans enrolled at St. John's College in New York City. After graduating from St. John's in 1846 with high honors, Rosecrans decided to enter the priesthood. Archbishop John Purcell sent him to Rome to study at the Pontifical Urbaniana University, where he earned his Doctor of Theology degree.

=== Priesthood ===
Rosecrans was ordained into the priesthood for the Archdiocese of Cincinnati in Rome by Cardinal Costantino Patrizi on June 5, 1852.

After touring through Italy, France, England, and Ireland, Rosecrans returned to Cincinnati. His first assignment was as pastor of St. Thomas' Parish in Cincinnati. He was then assigned as a curate at St. Peter in Chains Cathedral Parish and as a professor at Mount St. Mary's Seminary of the West, both in Cincinnati. In 1859, Purcell opened a college for Catholic youth in connection with the seminary and named Rosecrans as its president. However, the college closed in 1861 with the outbreak of the American Civil War.

=== Auxiliary Bishop of Cincinnati ===
On December 23, 1861, Rosecrans was appointed as an auxiliary bishop of Cincinnati and titular bishop of Pompeiopolis by Pope Pius IX. He received his episcopal consecration on March 25, 1862, from Purcell, with Bishops Martin Spalding and John Luers serving as co-consecrators, at the Cathedral of Saint Peter in Chains in Cincinnati. Following the consecration of Reverend Edward Fitzgerald as Bishop of Little Rock in February 1867, Rosecrans replaced him as pastor of St. Patrick's Parish in Columbus.

=== Bishop of Columbus ===
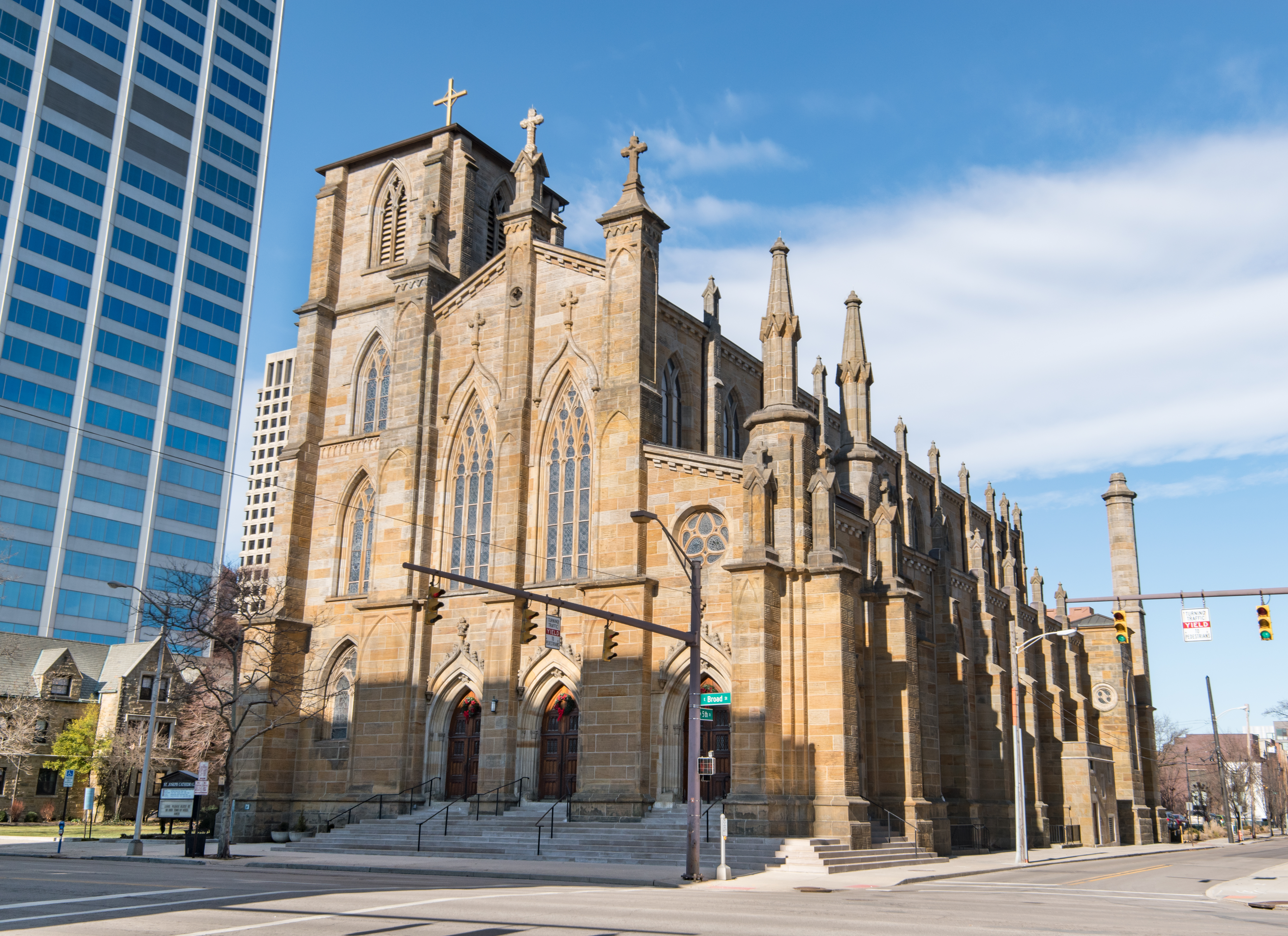
Saint Joseph Cathedral, Columbus, Ohio (2021)

Rosecrans was named the first bishop of the newly erected Diocese of Columbus on March 3, 1868, by Pope Pius IX. The new diocese included central, south central, and southeastern Ohio, roughly running from the Scioto River on the west across to the Ohio River along the east; it comprised 32 parishes and about 41,000 Catholics. Rosecrans journeyed throughout the diocese by stagecoach, wagon, and steamboat. The Vatican excused him from participating in the First Vatican Council (1869–1870) in Rome in order to tend to his new diocese.

During his 10-year-long tenure, Rosecrans founded St. Aloysius Seminary for young men in 1871, dedicated the diocese to the Sacred Heart in December 1873, and established the diocesan newspaper, The Catholic Columbian, in 1875. Rosecrans founded the following institutions in Columbus:

- St. Mary's of the Springs Academy for Young Ladies (1868)
- St. Joseph's Academy (1875)
- St. Vincent's Orphan Asylum (1875)
- Sacred Heart Convent

Rosecrans' greatest achievement was the construction of St. Joseph's Cathedral in Columbus, costing $220,000. He consecrated it on October 20, 1878.

=== Death and legacy ===
Sylvester Rosecrans died in Columbus on October 21, 1878, the day after the cathedral consecration. He was age 51. Bishop Rosecrans High School in Zanesville, Ohio, is named after him.

Catholic Church titles
Preceded by none	Bishop of Columbus; 1868–1878	Succeeded by John Ambrose Watterson
