= William V. Fisher Catholic High School =

Location
- 1803 Granville Pike; Lancaster, Fairfield County, Ohio 43130; United States; 39°44′42″N 82°35′14″W

Information
- Type: Private, Coeducational
- Motto: Enlightenment ∙ Education ∙ Understanding ∙ Activities
- Religious affiliation: Roman Catholic
- Established: 1891
- Oversight: Roman Catholic Diocese of Columbus
- Superintendent: Adam Dufault
- Principal: Luke Patterson
- Grades: 9–12
- Colors: Green and White
- Athletics conference: Mid-State League
- Nickname: The Irish
- Rival: Berne Union, Newark Catholic, Bishop Rosecrans
- Website: http://www.fishercatholic.org/

William V. Fisher Catholic High School is a private, Catholic high school in Lancaster, Ohio, USA.

== History ==
St. Mary High School was founded in 1891 in Lancaster, Ohio. It was renamed Bishop Fenwick High School in 1961. Fisher Catholic was built in 1971 at a new location north of downtown Lancaster.

In 1986, the William V. Fisher Catholic High School Foundation was formed to promote and provide support for Catholic Education in the Lancaster, Ohio area.

== Clubs and activities ==
The school's primary club is the pro-life club, Irish4Life. The club goes on the annual March for Life, and advocates for pro-life views locally. The president of the club is Isaac Hill, the Vice President is Ellie Funk, and the Secretary to the club is Lillia Funk. The club is supervised by theology teacher Jack Welsh.

The school's Quiz Team (Academic Challenge) is an actively competing club, representing the school since the mid-1980s. The quiz team won Ohio Academic Competition (OAC) State Championships in 2004 and 2006, NAQT Division II State Championship in 2006, and has won the local In The Know televised quiz bowl tournament in 2001, 2005, 2006 and 2007.

The team finished second in the OAC state finals to Northmont High School in May 2014 and third in the overall NAQT state championship behind Northmont and Dublin Scioto high schools. The program is among central Ohio's winningest regardless of discipline amongst Ohio high schools (academic/athletic).

== Athletics ==
=== Ohio High School Athletic Association State Championships ===
- Boys Golf - 2015
- Boys Basketball – 1930
- Girls Track and Field – 1998
