= Liberation of Saint Peter (disambiguation) =

The liberation of Peter is an event in the Acts of the Apostles.

The Liberation of Saint Peter may also refer to:

- Liberation of Saint Peter (Jacopo di Cione)
- Liberation of Saint Peter (Murillo)
- Liberation of Saint Peter (Raphael)
