= List of churches in the Diocese of Columbus =

This is a list of Catholic churches in the Diocese of Columbus. The diocese divides the parishes occupying these church buildings into deaneries for administrative purposes.

== List of Churches ==
=== Center-South Columbus Deanery ===
Name	Church Exterior	Church Interior	City/Town	Address	Style	Notes
Community of Holy Rosary and Saint John the Evangelist			Columbus	648 S Ohio Ave, Columbus, OH 43205	Gothic Revival	Parish has been closed
Holy Cross Church			Columbus	204 S 5th St, Columbus, OH 43215	Gothic Revival	The “Mother Church of Columbus”, the Holy Cross Church building was constructed in 1848 making it the oldest Christian church building in Columbus. It was added to the National Register of Historic Places in 1979, reference number 79001837.
Saint Leo Oratory (Columbus, Ohio)			Columbus	221 Hanford St, Columbus, OH 43206	Romanesque Revival	Saint Leo the Great Oratory is home to canons of the Institute of Christ the King Sovereign Priest. The church building is part of the Merion Village Ohio historical site.
Saint Dominic Church			Columbus	453 N 20th St, Columbus, OH 43203	Romanesque Revival	
Saint Joseph Cathedral			Columbus	212 E Broad St, Columbus, OH 43215		
Saint Mary, Mother of God Church			Columbus	684 S 3rd St, Columbus, OH 43206	Gothic Revival	Saint Mary Church is the third oldest church building in Columbus. The church spire towers 197 feet (60 m) above street level making it a prominent landmark and the tallest building in the historic German Village neighborhood south of downtown Columbus. With the rest of German Village, it was added to the National Register of Historic Places on December 30, 1974. It is also an Ohio historical site.
Saint Patrick Church			Columbus	280 N Grant Ave, Columbus, OH	Norman Gothic Revival	Saint Patrick Church is the second-oldest Catholic church building in Columbus. The structure served as the pro-cathedral of the Roman Catholic Diocese of Columbus until the consecration of Saint Joseph Cathedral. It has been served by priests of the Dominican Order since 1885. It is also an Ohio historical site.
Saint Thomas the Apostle Church			Columbus	2692 E 5th Ave, Columbus, OH 43219		
Saints Augustine and Gabriel Church			Columbus	1550 E Hudson St, Columbus, OH 43211		

=== Northwest Columbus Deanery ===
Name	Church Exterior	Church Interior	City/Town	Address	Style	Notes
Our Lady of Victory Church			Marble Cliff	1559 Roxbury Rd, Columbus, OH 43212	Romanesque Revival	
Saint Agatha Church			Upper Arlington	1860 Northam Rd, Upper Arlington, OH 43221	Greek Revival	
Saint Andrew Church			Upper Arlington	1899 McCoy Rd, Columbus, OH 43220		
Saint Brendan the Navigator Church			Hilliard	4475 Dublin Rd, Hilliard, OH 43026	Modernist	
Saint Brigid of Kildare Church			Dublin	7179 Avery Rd, Dublin, OH 43017	Neo-Norman	
Saint Christopher Church			Columbus	1420 Grandview Ave, Columbus, OH 43212		Served by the Pallottines since 2020.
Saint Joan of Arc Church			Powell	10700 Liberty Rd, Powell, OH 43065		
Saint Margaret of Cortona Church			Columbus	1600 N Hague Ave, Columbus, OH 43204	Modernist	
Saint Peter Church			Columbus	6899 Smoky Row Rd, Columbus, OH 43235		
Saint Timothy Church			Columbus	1088 Thomas Ln, Columbus, OH 43220		

=== North High Columbus Deanery ===
Name	Church Exterior	Church Interior	City/Town	Address	Style	Notes
Holy Name Church			Columbus	154 E Patterson Ave, Columbus, OH 43202	Romanesque revival	Holy Name Church is the seat of Our Lady of Guadalupe, Star of the New Evangelization Parish.
Immaculate Conception Church			Clintonville	414 E N Broadway St, Columbus, OH 43214	Romanesque Revival	
Our Lady of Peace Church			Columbus	20 E Dominion Blvd, Columbus, OH 43214	Modernist	
Sacred Heart Church			Columbus	893 Hamlet St, Columbus, OH 43201	Tudor Gothic	
Saint Francis of Assisi Church			Columbus	386 Buttles Ave, Columbus, OH 43215	Romanesque Revival	
Saint John the Baptist Italian Catholic Church			Columbus	720 Hamlet St, Columbus, OH 43215	Gothic Revival	Located in the Italian Village neighborhood of Columbus, St. John the Baptist Church was established as an Italian National parish rather than as a parish for a geographical area. Built in 1898, it is an Ohio historical site. St. Andrew Kim Taegon Korean Catholic Community (another national parish) meets at St. John the Baptist Church
Saint Michael Church			Worthington	5750 N High St, Worthington, OH 43085	Romanesque Revival	
Saint Thomas More Newman Center			Columbus	64 W Lane Ave, Columbus, OH 43201	Modernist	Church ministry is focused on the Ohio State University student community

=== Northland Columbus Deanery ===
Name	Church Exterior	Church Interior	City/Town	Address	Style	Notes
Church of the Resurrection			New Albany	6300 E Dublin Granville Rd, New Albany, OH 43054	Colonial Revival	
Saint Anthony Church			Columbus	2165 West Broad St., Columbus, OH 43223	Modernist	
Saint Elizabeth Church			Columbus	6077 Sharon Woods Blvd, Columbus, OH 43229	Modernist	
Saint James the Less Church			Columbus	1652 Oakland Park Ave, Columbus, OH 43224	Romanesque Revival	Served by the Missionaries of the Precious Blood
Saint John Neumann Church			Sunbury	9633 E, OH-37, Sunbury, OH 43074	Romanesque Revival	
Saint Matthias Church			Columbus	1582 Ferris Rd, Columbus, OH 43224	Modernist	
Saint Paul the Apostle Church			Westerville	313 N State St, Westerville, OH 43082	Romanesque Revival	

=== West Columbus Deanery ===
Name	Church Exterior	Church Interior	City/Town	Address	Style	Notes
Holy Family Church			Columbus	584 W Broad St, Columbus, OH 43215	Gothic Revival	Served by the Mercedarian Order since 2022.
Our Lady of Perpetual Help Church			Grove City	3730 Broadway, Grove City, OH 43123		
Saint Agnes Church			Columbus	2364 W Mound St, Columbus, OH 43204		
Saint Aloysius Church			Columbus	2165 W Broad St., Columbus, OH 43223	Romanesque Revival	
Saint Cecilia Church			Columbus	434 Norton Rd, Columbus, OH 43228		
Saint Joseph Church			Plain City	670 W Main St, Plain City, OH 43064	Romanesque Revival	
Saint Mary Magdalene Church			Columbus	473 S Roys Ave, Columbus, OH 43204	Gothic Revival	
Saint Patrick Church			London	61 S Union St, London, OH 43140	Gothic Revival	
Saint Stephen the Martyr Church			Columbus	4131 Clime Rd, Columbus, OH 43228		
Saints Simon and Jude Church			West Jefferson	9350 High Free Pike, West Jefferson, OH 43162	Gothic Revival	

=== East Columbus Deanery ===
Name	Church Exterior	Church Interior	City/Town	Address	Style	Notes
Christ the King Church			Columbus	2777 E Livingston Ave, Columbus, OH 43209	Modernist	
Holy Spirit Church			Whitehall	4383 E Broad St, Columbus, OH 43213	Modernist	
Our Lady of the Miraculous Medal Church			Columbus	5225 Refugee Rd, Columbus, OH 43232	Modernist	
Saint Catharine of Siena Church			Columbus	500 S Gould Rd, Columbus, OH 43209	Romanesque Revival	
Saint Elizabeth Ann Seton Church			Pickerington	600 Hill Rd N, Pickerington, OH 43147	Modernist	
Saint John XXIII Church			Canal Winchester	5170 Winchester Southern Rd, Canal Winchester, OH 43110	Federal Style	
Saint Mary Church			Groveport	5684 Groveport Rd, Groveport, OH 43125	Modernist	
Saint Matthew Church			Gahanna	807 Havens Corners Rd, Columbus, OH 43230	Gothic Revival	
Saint Philip the Apostle Church			Columbus	1573 Elaine Rd, Columbus, OH 43227	Modernist	This parish is closed
Saint Pius X Church			Reynoldsburg	1051 S Waggoner Rd, Reynoldsburg, OH 43068	Modernist	

=== Marion Columbus Deanery ===
Name	Church Exterior	Church Interior	City/Town	Address	Style	Notes
Immaculate Conception Church			Kenton	215 E North St, Kenton, OH 43326	Gothic Revival	
Our Lady of Lourdes Church			Ada	300 E Highland Ave, Ada, OH 45810	Carpenter Gothic	
Our Lady of Lourdes Church			Marysville	1033 W 5th St, Marysville, OH 43040	Modernist	
Sacred Hearts Church			Cardington	4680 US-42, Cardington, OH 43315	Romanesque Revival	
Saint Mary Church			Delaware	82 E William St, Delaware, OH 43015	Gothic Revival	In 1980, St. Mary's Church and its rectory were listed together on the National Register of Historic Places under reference number 80002994.
Saint Mary Church			Marion	251 N Main St, Marion, OH 43302	Gothic Revival	

=== Muskingum-Perry Deanery ===
Name	Church Exterior	Church Interior	City/Town	Address	Style	Notes
Church of the Atonement			Crooksville	320 Winter St, Crooksville, OH 43731	Gothic Revival	
Holy Trinity Church			Somerset	228 S. Columbus St., Somerset, OH 43783	Gothic Revival	Served by Dominican friars
Saint Ann Church			Dresden	405 Chestnut St, Dresden, OH 43821	Romanesque Revival	
Saint Bernard Church			Corning	425 Adams St, Corning, OH 43730	Romanesque Revival	
Saint Joseph Church			Somerset	5757 State Route 383, Somerset, OH 43783	Gothic Revival	It is the oldest Catholic church building in Ohio and home to Ohio's oldest Catholic parish which has been served by priests of the Dominican order since its foundation.
Saint Mary Church			Mattingly Settlement	6280 St Marys Rd, Nashport, OH 43830	Gothic Revival	
Saint Nicholas Church			Zanesville	925 E Main St, Zanesville, OH 43701	Romanesque Revival	
Saint Patrick Church			Junction City	1170 OH-668, Junction City, OH 43748	Gothic Revival	
Saint Rose Church			New Lexington	309 N Main St, New Lexington, OH 43764	Gothic Revival	
Saint Thomas Aquinas Church			Zanesville	144 N 5th St, Zanesville, OH 43701	Gothic Revival	

=== Knox-Licking Deanery ===
Name	Church Exterior	Church Interior	City/Town	Address	Style	Notes
Church of the Ascension			Johnstown	555 S Main St, Johnstown, OH 43031	Modernist	
Church of the Blessed Sacrament			Newark	394 E Main St, Newark, OH 43055	Romanesque Revival	
Our Lady of Mount Carmel Church			Buckeye Lake	5133 Walnut Rd, Buckeye Lake, OH 43008	Gothic Revival	
Saint Edward the Confessor Church			Granville	785 Newark Granville Rd, Granville, OH 43023	Palladian	
Saint Francis de Sales Church			Newark	40 Granville St, Newark, OH 43055	Richardsonian Romanesque	Jean-Baptiste Lamy was the parish's first pastor.
Saint Leonard Church			Heath	57 Dorsey Mill Rd E, Heath, OH 43056	Modernist	
Saint Luke Church			Danville	307 N Market St, Danville, OH 43014	Gothic Revival	Jean-Baptiste Lamy was the parish's first resident pastor
Saint Vincent de Paul Church			Mount Vernon	303 E High St, Mt Vernon, OH 43050	English Gothic Revival	Jean-Baptiste Lamy was the parish's first pastor.

=== Tuscarawas-Holmes-Coshocton Deanery ===
Name	Church Exterior	Church Interior	City/Town	Address	Style	Notes
Holy Trinity Church			Bolivar	1835 Dover Zoar Rd NE, Bolivar, OH 44612		
Immaculate Conception Church			Dennison	Immaculate Conception Church, 206 N 1st St, Dennison, OH 44621		
Sacred Heart Church			Coshocton	805 Main St., Coshocton, OH 43812-1694	Gothic Revival	
Sacred Heart Church			New Philadelphia	139 3rd St NE, New Philadelphia, OH 44663	Romanesque Revival	
Saint Francis de Sales Church			Newcomerstown	440 S River St, Newcomerstown, OH 43832		
Saint Joseph Church			Dover	613 N Tuscarawas Ave, Dover, OH 44622	Modernist	
Saint Peter Church			Millersburg	379 S Crawford St, Millersburg, OH 44654	Romanesque Revival	
Saints Peter and Paul Church			Glenmont	139 Main St, Glenmont, OH 44628	Gothic revival	

=== Fairfield-Hocking-Pickaway Deanery ===
Name	Church Exterior	Church Interior	City/Town	Address	Style	Notes
Saint Bernadette Church			Lancaster	1343 Wheeling Rd, Lancaster, OH 43130	Modernist	
Saint John Church			Logan	351 N Market St, Logan, OH 43138	Gothic Revival	Added to the National Register of Historic Places in 1997, reference number 97000200.
Saint Joseph Church			Circleville	134 W Mound St, Circleville, OH 43113	Gothic Revival	
Saint Joseph Church			Sugar Grove	308 Elm St, Sugar Grove, OH 43155	Carpenter Gothic	
Saint Mark Church			Lancaster	324 Gay St, Lancaster, OH 43130	Gothic Revival	
Saint Mary Church			Bremen	602 Marietta St, Bremen, OH 43107	Modernist	
Basilica of Saint Mary of the Assumption			Lancaster	132 S High St, Lancaster, OH 43130	Gothic Revival	The building is a contributing property to the Square 13 Historic District (reference number 72001008, added in 1972) which itself was incorporated into the Lancaster Historic District (reference number 83003438, added in 1983). Pope Francis named the church a minor basilica in 2022. It is the 91st minor basilica in the United States, the seventh in Ohio, and the first in the Diocese of Columbus.

=== Southern Deanery ===
Name	Church Exterior	Church Interior	City/Town	Address	Style	Notes
Holy Redeemer Church			Portsmouth	1325 Gallia St, Portsmouth, OH 45662	Romanesque Revival	
Holy Trinity Church			Jackson	215 Columbia St, Jackson, OH 45640	Gothic Revival	
Holy Trinity Church			Pond Creek	9493 Careys Run, West Portsmouth, OH 45663		
Our Lady of Lourdes Church			Otway	6846 OH-73, Otway, OH 45657		Parish closed in October 2021
Our Lady of Sorrows Church			West Portsmouth	2215 Galena Pike, West Portsmouth, OH 45663		Parish closed in October 2021
Saint Colman of Cloyne Church			Washington Court House	219 S North St, Washington Court House, OH 43160		
Saint Mary Queen of Missions Church			Waverly	407 S. Market St., Waverly, OH 45690-1699		
Saint Mary of the Annunciation Church			Portsmouth	514 Market St, Portsmouth, OH 45662	Gothic Revival	Listed on the National Register of Historic Places. Reference number: 79001940
Saint Mary Church			Chillicothe	61 S Paint St, Chillicothe, OH 45601	Gothic Revival	Contributing property to Chillicothe's Old Residential District listed on the National Register of Historic Places under reference number 73001523
Saint Monica			New Boston	4252 Pine St, New Boston, OH 45662		Parish closed in October 2021
Saint Peter Church			Chillicothe	118 Church St, Chillicothe, OH 45601		
Saint Peter in Chains Church			Wheelersburg	2167 Lick Run-Lyra Rd, Wheelersburg, OH 45694		
Saint Sylvester Church			Zaleski	119 N 2nd St, Zaleski, OH 45698	Romanesque Revival	
Saints Peter and Paul Church			Wellston	229 S New York Ave, Wellston, OH 45692		

=== Other ===
Name	Church Exterior	Church Interior	City/Town	Address	Style	Notes
Saint Therese Retreat Center			Columbus	5277 East Broad Street, Columbus, OH, 43213	Romanesque	

=== Former Churches ===
Name	Church Exterior	Church Interior	City/Town	Address	Style	Notes
Corpus Christi Church			Columbus	1111 Stewart Ave, Columbus, OH	Modernist	Closed in 2023. Demolished in December 2025.
Saint Ladislas Church			Columbus	277 Reeb Ave, Columbus, OH 43207	Modernist	Closed in 2023. Building sold to a nonprofit serving homeless youth.
