= Sacred Heart Church (Columbus, Ohio) =

Catholic parish church

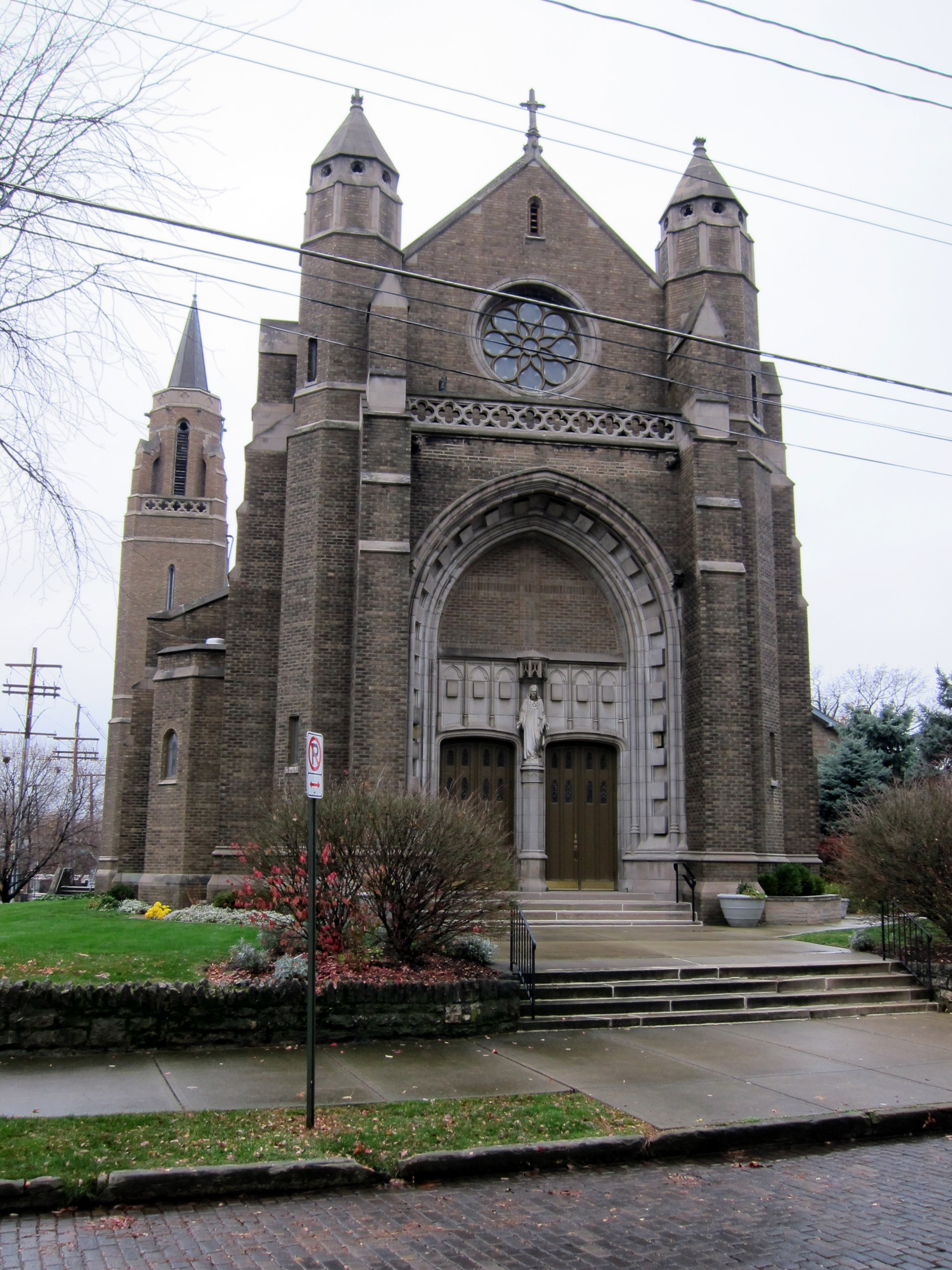
- Sacred Heart Church
- 39.980916°N 83.000145°W
- Location: 893 Hamlet Street, Columbus, Ohio
- Denomination: Catholic
- Website: sacredheartchurchcolumbus.org

History
- Founded: 1875
- Founder: Father John B. Elis
- Dedicated: November 29, 1923

Architecture
- Architect: Robert Kraus
- Architectural type: Tudor Gothic

Specifications
- Capacity: 800
- Length: 155
- Width: 80 feet
- Height: 52

Administration
- Diocese: Diocese of Columbus

Clergy
- Bishop: Earl Fernandes
- Priest: Msgr. Frank Lane

Sacred Heart Church is a parish church of the Diocese of Columbus in the Italian Village neighborhood of Columbus, Ohio. The parish was founded in 1875, making it the third-oldest Catholic parish in the city. The current Tudor Gothic church was completed in 1923.

== History ==
Around 1852 or 1853, William Phelan, of Lancaster, Ohio, willed to the diocese four acres of land, which became the grounds of Sacred Heart. This tract of land forms a square bounded by Summit Street, First Avenue, Second Avenue and Hamlet Street. The land was given with the stipulation that it was to be used for "religious and educational purposes and none other." As early as 1875, the lot was in the midst of a rapidly growing Catholic population which was seeking homes north of the Union Station.

=== Father Elis made pastor ===
In May 1875, Sylvester Rosecrans, then bishop of Columbus determined that a combination school and church should be built, and commissioned Fr. John B. Eis, who had been assistant at Holy Cross Church from 1872 to 1875, to build the new parish. On September 5 the cornerstone was laid by Bishop Sylvester Rosecrans. The structure was completed in the spring of 1876, and on Easter Sunday, April 16, Mass was celebrated in it for the first time. John B. Hemsteger performed the dedication in the absence of Rosecrans.

=== Sacred Heart School ===
On the 19th of April 1876, 83 pupils were enrolled into the new school, which was run by Sisters of St. Francis of Penance and Christian Charity. Before the end of that term, the number of pupils had increased to 250. When school opened again in the subsequent September there were 305 pupils in charge of five Sisters. The enrollment steadily grew year after year, until there were more than 600 pupils in attendance.

=== Building additions ===
The rapid and continued growth of the congregation demanded a corresponding increase in the accommodations. Several additions were accordingly made to the building; In 1877 the pastoral residence was added to the south end of the building, and in 1886 a convent for the Sisters was built on the north end. Upon completion, the building was about 175 feet long and 80 feet wide and cost about $80,000.

=== Assistant pastors ===
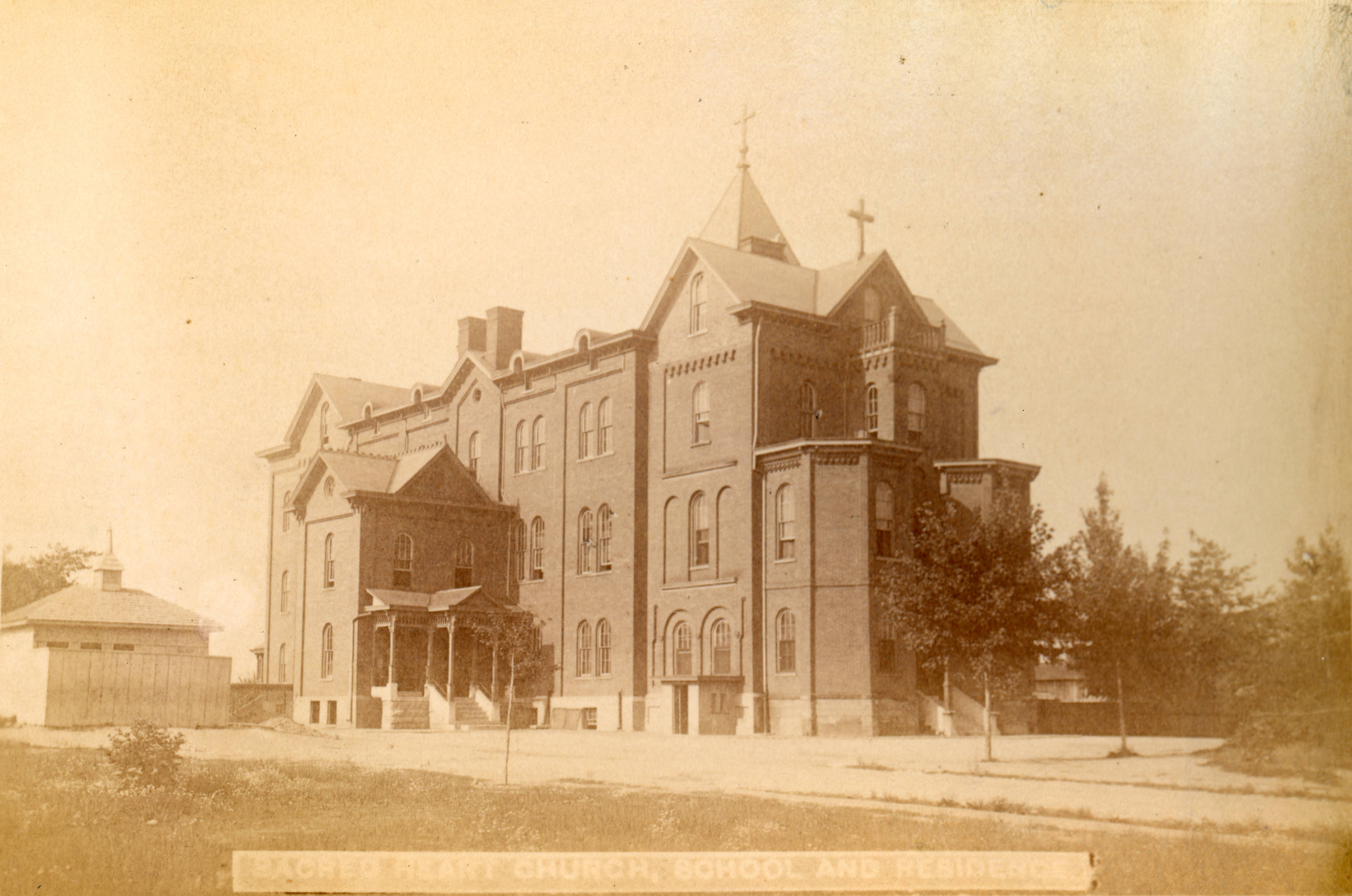
The original combined church and school building at Sacred Heart circa 1900. It was torn down in 1957.

Tending to the needs of a growing church, Fr. Eis had the assistance at different times of several priests. Fr. Hormisch assisted from 1878 to 1880, then Fr. Hochmiller of the Josephinum College. It was not until March 1889, that a regular assistant was appointed by Bishop John Watterson. Fr. Hugh Ewinghad been ordained but a short time when he was sent to Sacred Heart Church, and continued until the formation of St. Peter's parish of which he was made pastor. After Fr. Ewing, Rev. Augustine Vassal aided Father Eis for eleven years, until the spring of 1907. Then Fr. William Schaeffer became assistant and continued until October 1908, when the assistant Fr. John Curran was appointed. The latter—never very strong—fell victim to the flu epidemic and died November 5, 1918. Besides his parish duties, Father Curran was also acting as Superintendent of Schools for the Diocese. He was a native of Bellaire and lies buried in that city.

It was not a small task to unite into one the diverse parishioners of Sacred Heart. English-speakers formed by far the greater proportion who spoke neither French or German. Speaking all three with ease and fluency, Father Eis was able to impart instruction to all his parishioners in their own language.

The rapid growth of this section of the city made it evident that another parish would be needed; this need was further emphasized by the fact that many Catholics were building their homes in the western portion of the parish, at a considerable distance from the Church. As early as 1875 Mass had been said in a hall, called St. Pius' Chapel, on West Goodale Street. The attendance, however, was small, and the attempt to form a parish premature. In 1890 the need of a Church west of Dennison Avenue became evident. Bishop Watterson purchased from Robert E. Neil in February, 1890, six lots on the comer of Buttles and Harrison Avenues. These lots extending 40 feet of Buttles Avenue and 140 feet of Harrison Avenue afforded a suitable site for church property. Rev. A. M. Leyden was appointed pastor of the newly formed parish of St. Francis in June, 1892, being transferred from Toronto, Ohio, where he had faithfully served the missions for six years.

The growth of the north end continued, and soon the necessity of erecting a church in the eastern part of the parish became obvious. This section was called Milo. Some time previously Father Eis had rented from Mr. Thomas Benson a storeroom on Cleveland Avenue. A school was opened here for the benefit of the younger children who found it difficult to come to Sacred Heart School. There were eighty pupils in attendance, and one of the Sisters of St. Francis went each day from Sacred Heart Convent to teach the school.

=== Sacred Heart Commercial School ===
In the year 1892 Father John B. Eis, pastor of Sacred Heart Church, opened a two year high school for boys and girls. The Sisters in charge were Sister Callista, Sister Amalia and Sister Augustine. In 1905 when St. Patrick's College (now Aquinas) was started, the boys' part of Sacred Heart High School was discontinued—the boys transferred to the new college. In 1908 the high school became strictly a commercial school for girls. Mother Claver was the founder and first teacher. She remained in charge until 1928. She was assisted by Sister Patrick and Sister Lioba and later by Mother Ida who succeeded her as principal in 1928. Other Sisters who have taught in the school are Sisters Leonard, Innocita, Norbert, Angelice, and Sister Pascal.

In the summer of 1895, Fr. Eis and Fr. Ewing were requested by Bishop Watterson to look for suitable property in Milo, with the view of starting a new parish. They selected a site on New York Avenue and Mr. John Sweeney was authorized by the Bishop to purchase the property, which he did Nov. 14, 1895, for the sum of $2,666.66. The new parish was called St. Peter's and Father Ewing was appointed pastor.

The growth of cities seems to be "up stream" and this tendency was verified in the development of Columbus. The northern portion of the parish was rapidly building up and Eis foreseeing the need of a parish at the outskirts of the city, purchased a large piece of land on Patterson Avenue. On June 4, 1905, Rt. Rev. Bishop Hartley established Holy Name parish and appointed as pastor, Rev. William McDermott.

By 1917, the territory comprised within the limits of Sacred Heart Parish was small in comparison to its extent at the time the parish was formed in 1875. Then it included all the area lying in the North End, from the railroad to the Franklin County line on the north. The parish limits in 1917 extended from the railroad yards on the south to Chittenden Avenue on the north, then west on Chittenden Avenue to High Street, and west on Eleventh Avenue to Hunter Street, thence south on Hunter Street to King Avenue, then south on Dennison Avenue to West Fifth Avenue, then south on Park Street to the railroad yards.

The parish of the Sacred Heart in October 1917 had about 420 families and 1750 parishioners. In the forty-one years of its existence there had been 3292 baptisms, 1194 burials and 776 marriages. Thirty five young ladies of the parish had entered the convent, four young men had been raised to the priesthood.

=== Death of Father Elis ===
Eis contraced influenza in 1918, and he never fully recovered. His condition was complicated with age and he died at St. Francis Hospital, December 9, 1922. John B. Eis was pastor of Sacred Heart Parish for over forty years. One of his great skills was a knowledge of several languages, which was most helpful to him in his parochial duties. Father Eis is buried in St. Joseph Cemetery, and the parish shortly after his death marked his last resting place with a fine monument.

=== Father Ryan appointed pastor ===
During the first illness of Eis, priests Hackett, Fischer and Kilgallen looked after the spiritual needs of the parish. In July, 1919, the Reverend James M. Ryan who had been serving as Chaplain of the 133rd Machine Gun Battalion in France, was appointed by Bishop Hartley to be Administrator of Sacred Heart Parish and commissioned to build a new church and parish house. Father Ryan had been ordained in 1908 and served as Assistant Pastor in St. Francis de Sales Church, Newark, Ohio, and St. John Church at Bellaire, Ohio. In June, 1914, he was appointed Pastor of Holy Cross Church in Glouster, Ohio, and remained there until he entered the Army as a chaplain. Upon his arrival at Sacred Heart, Father Ryan began immediately to lay the ground work for the new church. A debt of several thousand dollars was paid off and a drive started to raise a building fund. In January, 1920, the "Sacred Heart Church Calendar" was inaugurated in its present format to record the various activities and progress of the parish. It was a monthly publication.

=== The new church ===
By 1922, over $50,000 had been collected and plans for the church and rectory drawn by Robert Kraus, an architect from Akron, Ohio, were accepted; and actual construction commenced in May, 1922. Despite delays, satisfactory progress was made and on Thanksgiving Day, November 29, 1923, at 10 p.m., the new church was solemnly dedicated to the service of Almighty God by Bishop Hartley. It is of pure Tudor Gothic design and has been pronounced one of the most correct and beautiful churches in the state of Ohio. It is 155 feet long, 80 fee tin width and 52 feet high. The main tower is 105 feet high. Including a small chapel–a complete church in itself–the edifice has a seating capacity of almost 800.

The following article appeared in the January 15, 1924, issue of the Ohio State Lantern written by Professor W. L. Graves of the Ohio State University:

"If you want to see a beautiful building, stop in at the Church of the Sacred Heart at the corner of Hamlet Street and First Avenue. All fall I was interested in seeing the fine structure rise, but not until Sunday did I see the completed effect. 1stepped inside and found the church was empty except for a black-gowned nun who was directing some subdued small boys in the gathering up of books used in a service. I mentioned my wish to see the church and she walked about with me, pleased at my admiration. She took me back into the lovely little Lady Chapel and told me what she knew about the structure as a whole. The building is of brick, in a soft warm color, light tan, with stone combination. The design is 13th century Gothic, and there are especially attractive details in the separate bell-tower, the small rose window above the mainentrance, the dignified round columns of Caen stone along the nave, the carved oak of the confessional booths, and certain of the windows. The church has a perfect unity of effect, a beautiful serenity and dignity of design that makes worship there, one feels, a memorable experience."

By the end of 1925, the entire cost of the new church and rectory, together with the remodeling of the school had been paid off. There must be included in these extraordinary expenses also a $12,000 subscription to the new St. Charles Seminary. At no time was the bank debt more than $20,000.

Upon the completion of the new church in 1923, Mass was transferred from the old church and the now-vacant was turned into school rooms. The school was remodeled to serve as classrooms for the grammar and commercial school. This building was demolished in 1957.

St. Charles Seminary had its start at Sacred Heart. Bishop Hartley had announced in 1923 plans for the erection of a Diocesan Seminary for the preparatory education of boys with a view to fostering vocations for the priesthood. And in order to get the school under way even before the new St. Charles building was completed, school room space was made available at Sacred Heart. On September 5, 1923, twenty-seven boys were enrolled in the first year of the new school.

=== Great Depression to present ===
In the fall of 1934, Pope Pius XI recognized the priestly work of Ryan and named him a Domestic Prelate of the Papal Household. Despite the Great Depression and many families moving from the district, the parish remained generally strong. About this time Monsignor Ryan had a heart attack on October 19, 1944, died at Mt. Carmel Hospital, October 20, 1944. His body is buried in St. Joseph Cemetery.

After Monsignor Ryan's death, Fr. Kerrigan was appointed Administrator and served the parish in that capacity until March 15, 1945, when Mt. Rev. Edward Hettinger came as pastor. Fr. Bernard Jones was appointed assistant pastor at the same time. The latter was transferred to St. Luke's, Danville on August 31, 1947, and his place was taken by Rev. Father Edgar Hoffman.

A new school building was completed in 1957 and the original parish building, that had housed church, rectory convent, and school, was demolished. A four-year business high school for girls was opened in 1957 with an initial class of 40 students, with four classes attending in 1960/61 and the first graduation at the end of that academic year. The Diocesan School Board decided in 1965 to close this high school and the last class was graduated on August 14, 1966. There were an average of about thirty graduates in each class of the four-year school. Many of the students transferred to Holy Name School. St. Joseph Montessori School took over the former Sacred Heart school buildings at 933 Hamlet Street in 1987, spending $150,000 on renovations.

Samuel Ritchey, the pastor of the parish in 1999, was removed from his post due to sexually abusing a minor more than 20 years before.

As of 2022, the Sisters Servants of the Sacred Heart live in the parish convent.

The church also hosts a local Syro-Malabar congregation's celebrations of the Liturgy of Addai and Mari.
