= Liberation of Peter =

Biblical event

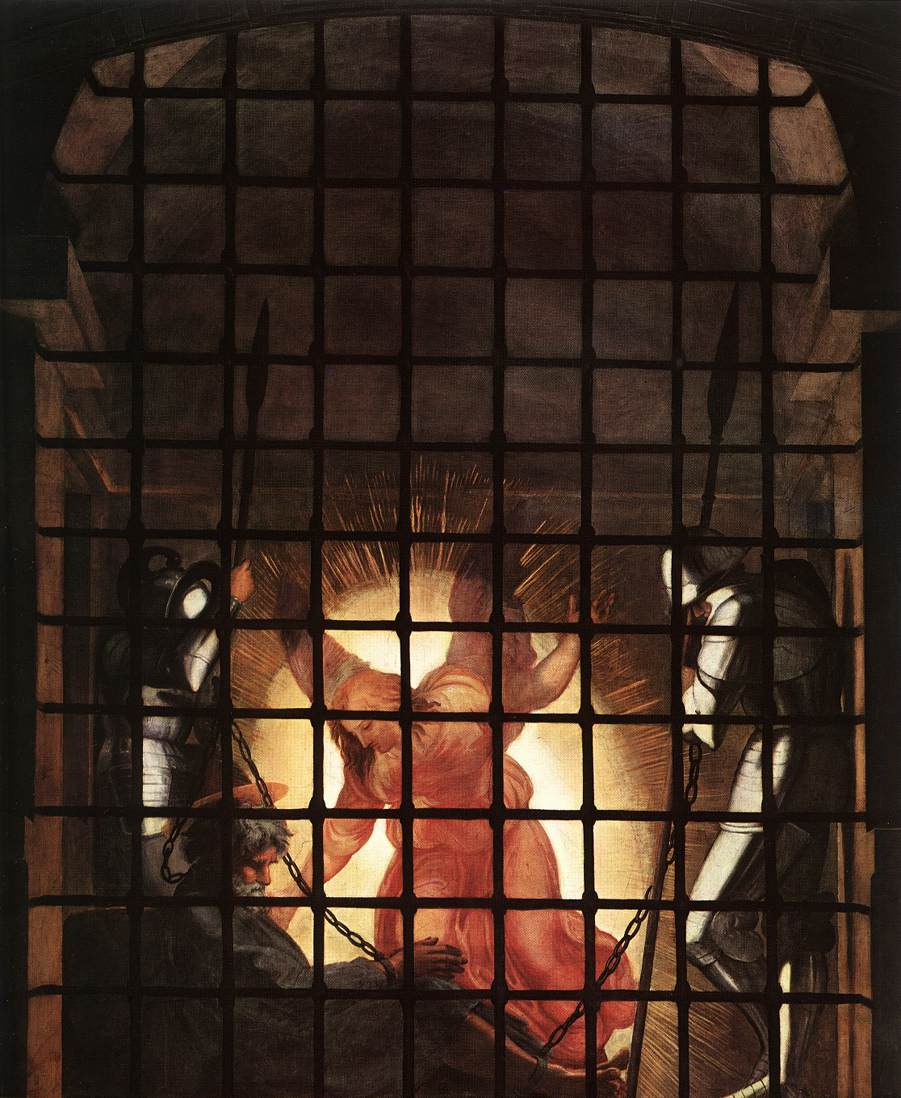
Detail from the Liberation of Saint Peter (1514) by Raphael

The liberation of the apostle Peter is an event described in chapter 12 of the Acts of the Apostles, in which the apostle Peter is rescued from prison by an angel. Although described in a short textual passage, the tale has given rise to theological discussions and has been the subject of a number of artworks.

== Biblical narrative ==
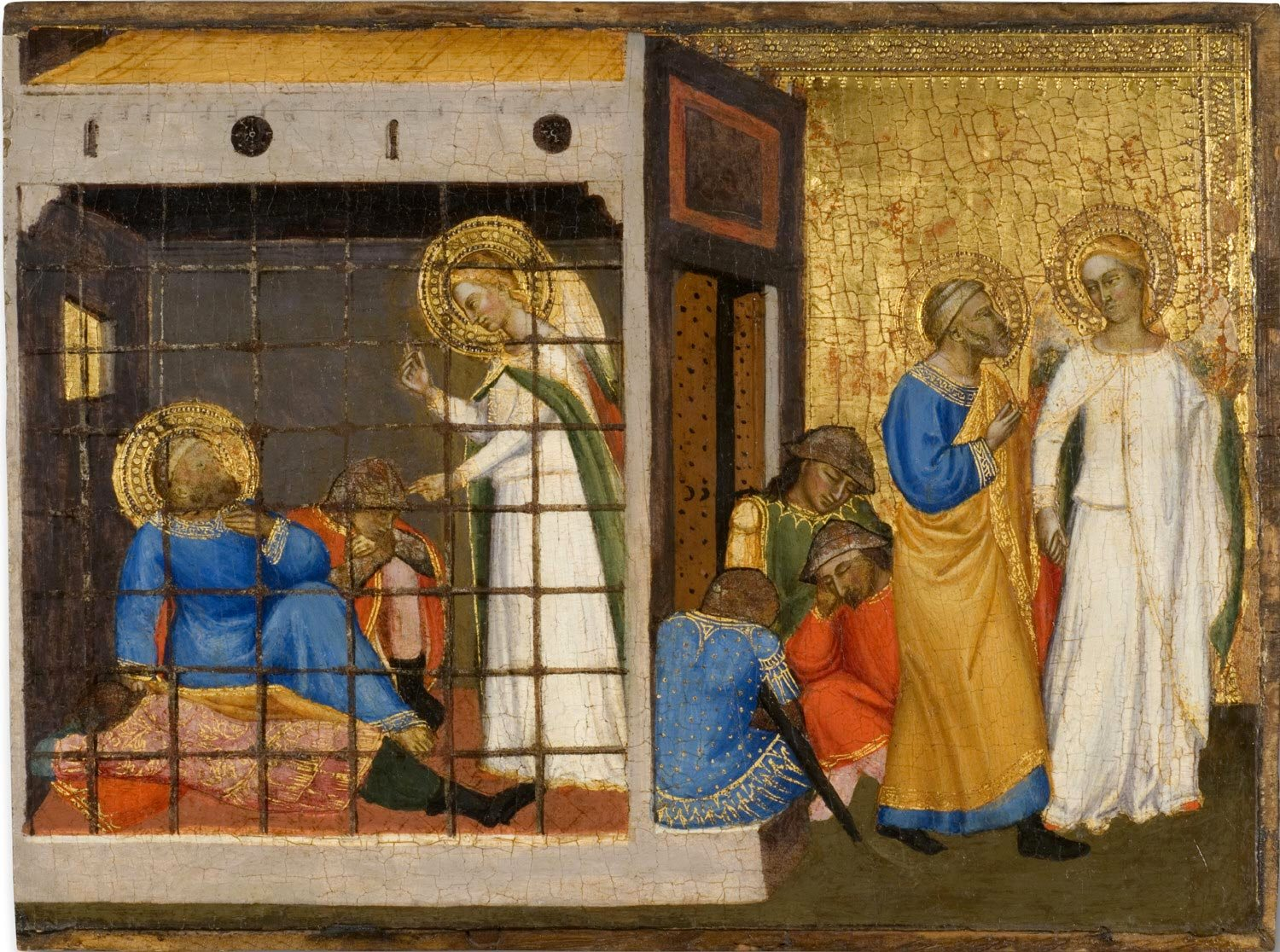
Jacopo di Cione, Liberation of Saint Peter (1370–1371)

Acts 12:3–19 says that Peter was put into prison by King Herod, but the night before his trial an angel appeared to him, and told him to leave. Peter's chains fell off, and he followed the angel out of prison, thinking it was a vision (verse 9). The prison doors opened of their own accord, and the angel led Peter into the city.

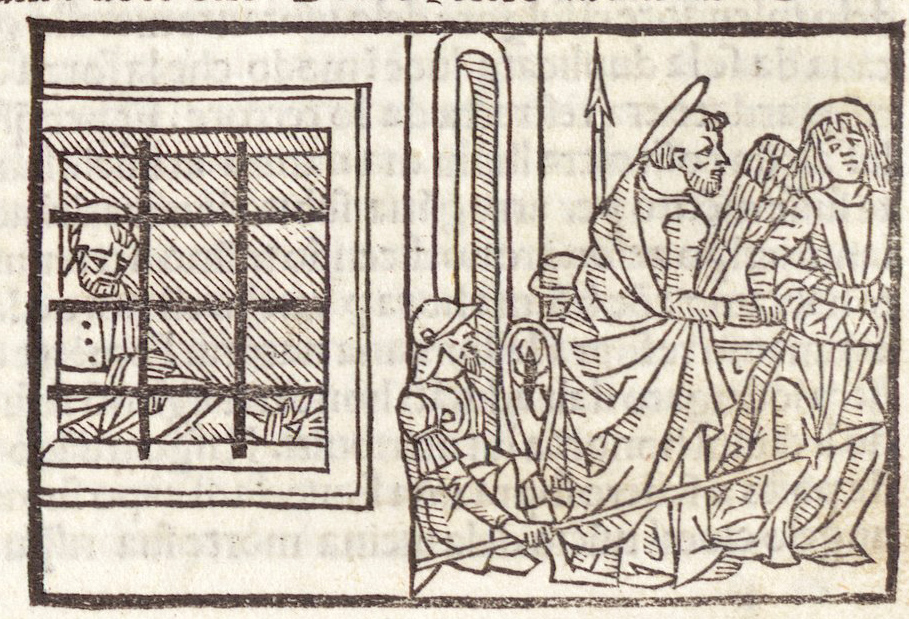
The liberation of Peter in the Golden Legend (1497)

When the angel suddenly left him, Peter came to himself and returned to the house of Mary, the mother of John Mark. A servant girl called Rhoda came to answer the door, and when she heard Peter's voice she was so overjoyed that she rushed to tell the others, and forgot to open the door for Peter (verse 14). Eventually Peter is let in and describes "how the Lord had brought him out of prison" (verse 17). When his escape is discovered, Herod orders the guards to be put to death.

== Literary interpretation ==
Loveday Alexander describes this episode as "one of the most sensational" in the Acts of the Apostles. He notes that Peter's situation was "perilous" yet he was sleeping peacefully. There is a greater "dramatic tension" in this narrative than in an earlier record of the escape of the apostles from prison, mentioned briefly in Acts 5:18–19.

== Theological significance ==
F. F. Bruce argues that "direct divine intervention is strongly indicated" in this narrative. He contrasts the story of Peter to that of James the Great, who was reported in verse 2 as having been executed by Herod, and notes that why "James should die while Peter should escape" is a "mystery of divine providence".

James B. Jordan suggests that this incident is portrayed as being a type of resurrection for Peter. Noting that one of the major themes of the Book of Acts is that "Christ's servants follow in His footsteps", Jordan argues that the events of the chapter "recapitulate the resurrection of Jesus". Amy-Jill Levine and Marianne Blickenstaff, like Jordan, relate the disbelief of Rhoda's message to Luke 24:1–12, where most of the disciples refuse to believe the news of the resurrection brought by a group of women.

== Depiction in art ==
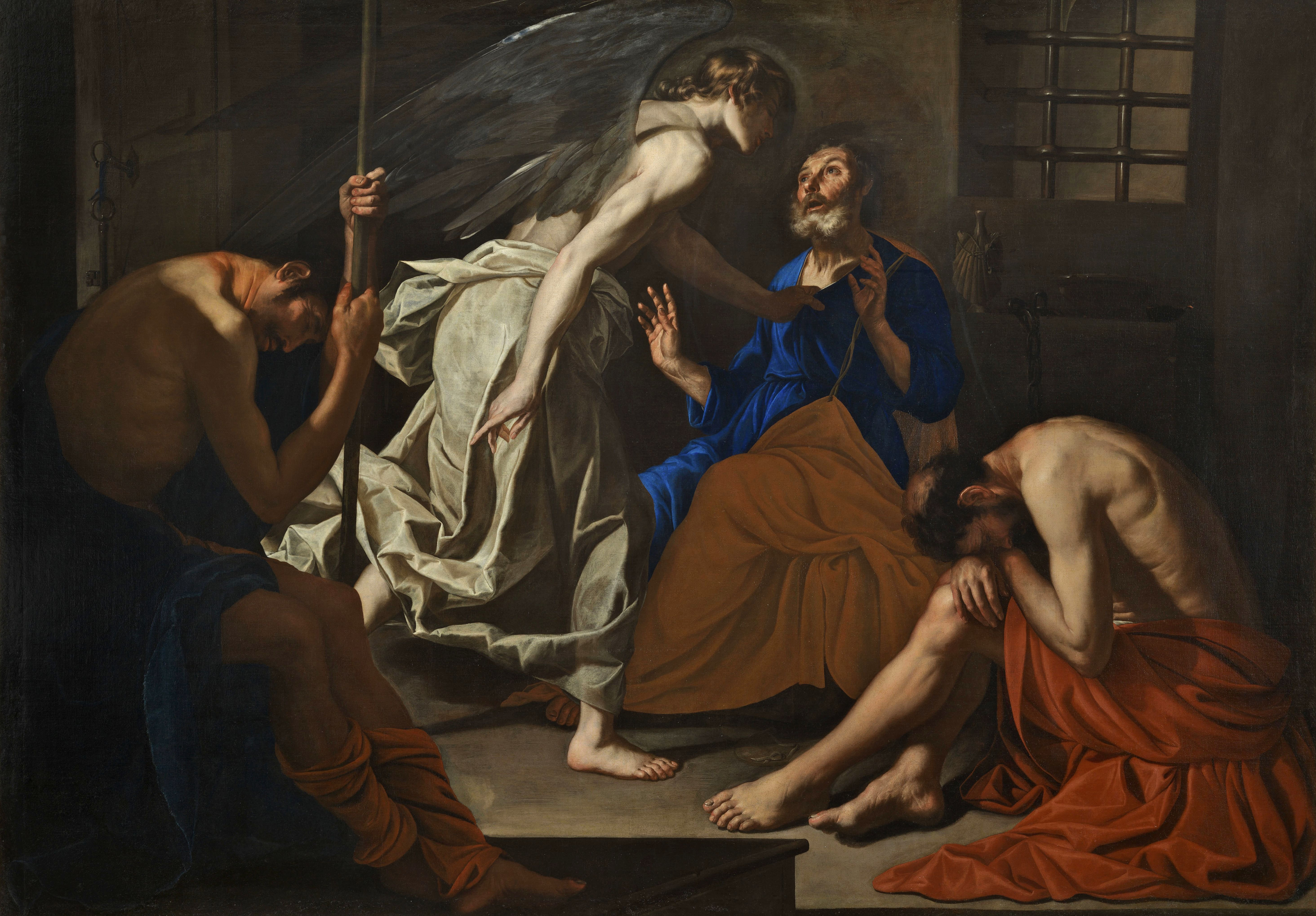
Antonio de Bellis, Liberation of Saint Peter (early 1640s)

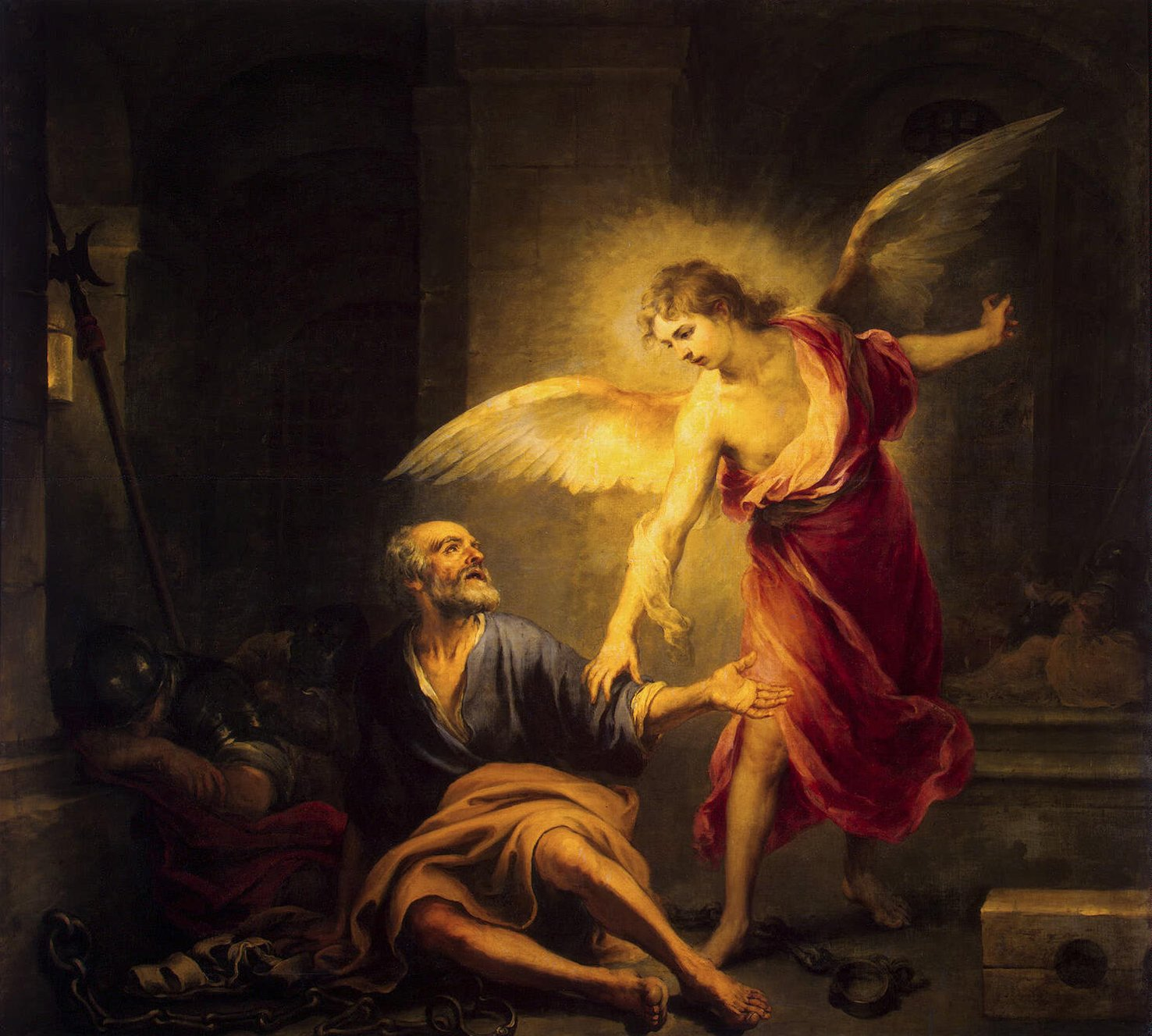
Bartolomé Esteban Murillo, Liberation of Saint Peter (1665–1667)

The following artists have depicted this event:

- Antonio de Bellis, Liberation of Saint Peter
- Battistello Caracciolo, Liberation of Saint Peter
- Jacopo di Cione, Liberation of Saint Peter
- Giovanni Ghisolfi, Liberation of Saint Peter
- Giovanni Lanfranco, Liberation of Saint Peter
- Gerrit van Honthorst, Liberation of Saint Peter
- Bartolomé Esteban Murillo, Liberation of Saint Peter
- Filippo Lippi, Liberation of Saint Peter (fresco in the Brancacci Chapel)
- Pier Francesco Mola, Liberation of Saint Peter
- Raphael, Liberation of Saint Peter
- Sebastiano Ricci, Liberation of Saint Peter
- Matthias Stom, Liberation of Saint Peter
- Bernardo Strozzi, Liberation of Saint Peter
- Jusepe de Ribera painted the scene twice:
  - Liberation of Saint Peter (1639) is in the Museo del Prado
  - Liberation of Saint Peter (1642) is in the Gemäldegalerie Alte Meister.

== Veneration ==
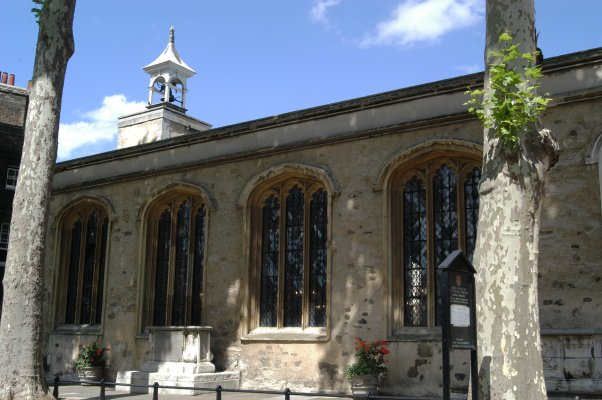
The Chapel Royal of St Peter ad Vincula, the parish church of the Tower of London

A number of churches are named after "Saint Peter in Chains" (St Peter ad Vincula, Italian San Pietro in Vincoli), including in Rome (which claims to house the very chains that fell from Peter's hands), in Pisa, in London, at Birżebbuġa in southern Malta, Tollard Royal (UK), in Cincinnati, and in Wheelersburg, OH.

The relic of the Chains of Saint Peter were kept in Jerusalem, where they were venerated by Christian pilgrims. In the fourth century, the Patriarch of Jerusalem, Saint Juvenal, presented them to Eudocia, wife of the Emperor Theodosius the Younger, and she took them to Constantinople.

Later, Eudocia sent a portion of the chains to Rome with her daughter Licinia Eudoxia, the wife of Valentinian III. Licinia Eudoxia built the church of S. Petrus ad Vincula on the Esquiline Hill to house the relic. Also in Rome was the relic of the chains with which Peter was bound when he was imprisoned by Nero. These latter chains were placed in the same church as the chains from Jerusalem.

== Festivals ==
The traditional festival of "St Peter in Chains" was on 1 August, and had the collect:

O God, who didst deliver thy holy Apostle Saint Peter from his bonds and suffer him to depart unhurt:
vouchsafe, we pray thee; to deliver us from the bonds of our sins, and of thy mercy preserve us from all evil.

It was included in the pre-1962 General Calendar of the Roman Rite (see the Tridentine calendar, the General Roman Calendar as in 1954 and the General Roman Calendar of Pope Pius XII). Traditional Roman Catholics continue to celebrate the feast day of "St Peter's Chains" either as a Greater-Double or a Double Major feast. In the Orthodox Church this feast is celebrated on January 16.

== Other references ==
Acts 12:7 is referred to in verse 4 of Charles Wesley's hymn And Can It Be:

Long my imprisoned spirit lay,
Fast bound in sin and nature's night;
Thine eye diffused a quickening ray;
I woke, the dungeon flamed with light;
My chains fell off, my heart was free,
I rose, went forth, and followed thee.
