= Holy Name Church (Columbus, Ohio) =

Catholic church and shrine in Ohio, US

- Santa Cruz Parish; Our Lady of Guadalupe, Star of the New Evangelization Parish
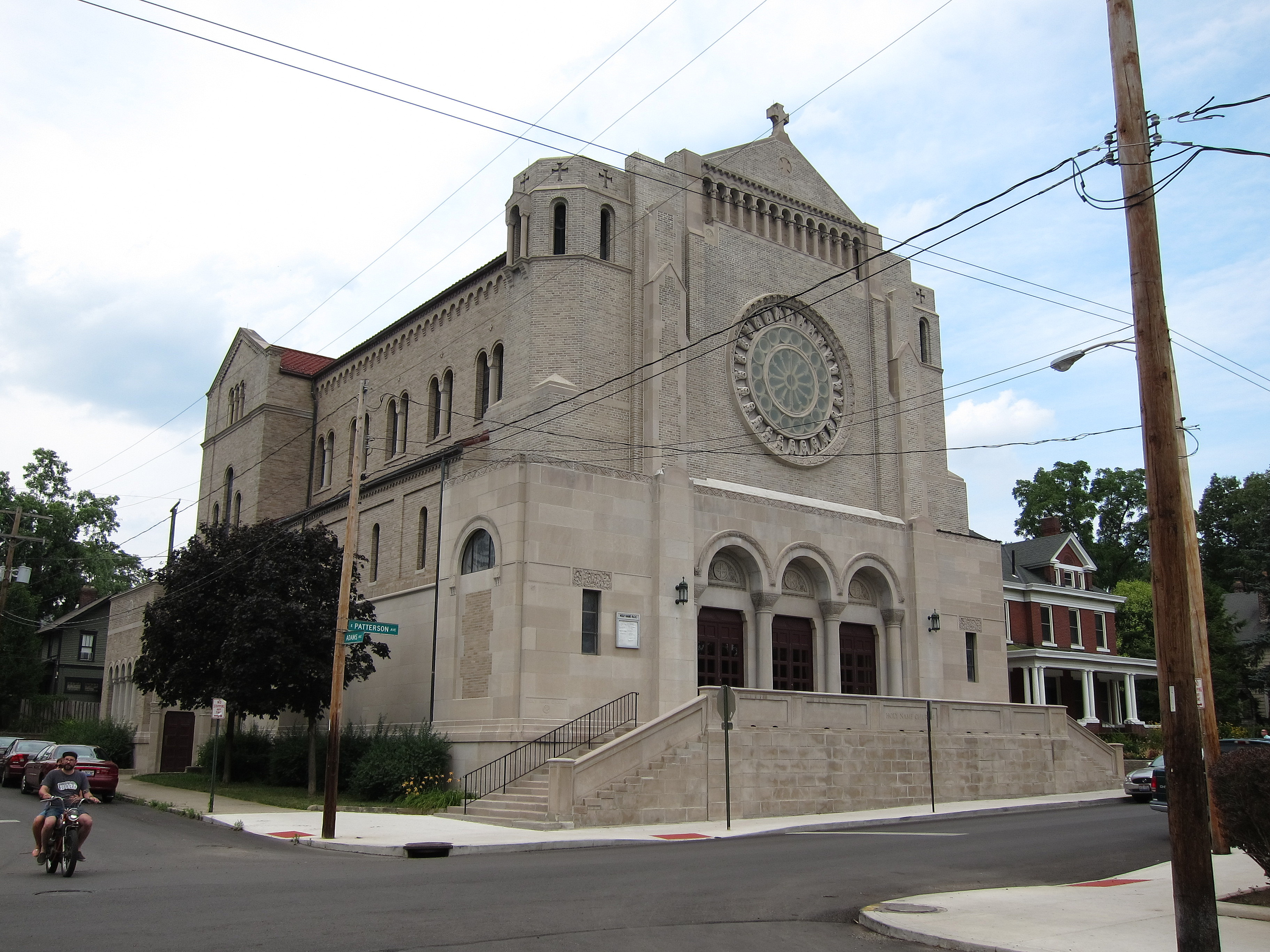
- Holy Name Church
- 40.01013°N 83.00621°W
- Address: 154 E. Patterson Avenue; Columbus, Ohio
- Denomination: Catholic Church
- Sui iuris church: Latin Church

History
- Founded: May 3, 1905
- Founder: Fr. William McDermott
- Consecrated: September 11, 1927

Architecture
- Architect: Edward Ramsey
- Architectural type: Byzantine-Romanesque
- Completed: 1927

Administration
- Diocese: Diocese of Columbus
- Parish: Our Lady of Guadalupe, Star of the New Evangelization

Clergy
- Bishop: Earl K. Fernandes
- Pastor: Father Antonio Carvalho

Holy Name Church is a Catholic church and diocesan shrine, the seat of Our Lady of Guadalupe, Star of the New Evangelization Parish in Columbus, Ohio. It is part of the Diocese of Columbus and located just north of the campus of the Ohio State University.

The parish was erected in 1905, and the current Byzantine-Romanesque church was dedicated in 1927. In 2001, it became the site of Masses for Santa Cruz parish, a personal parish for Latin-American Catholics in Franklin County, and in 2024 it was designated as a diocesan shrine to Our Lady of Guadalupe.

== History ==
=== Founding ===
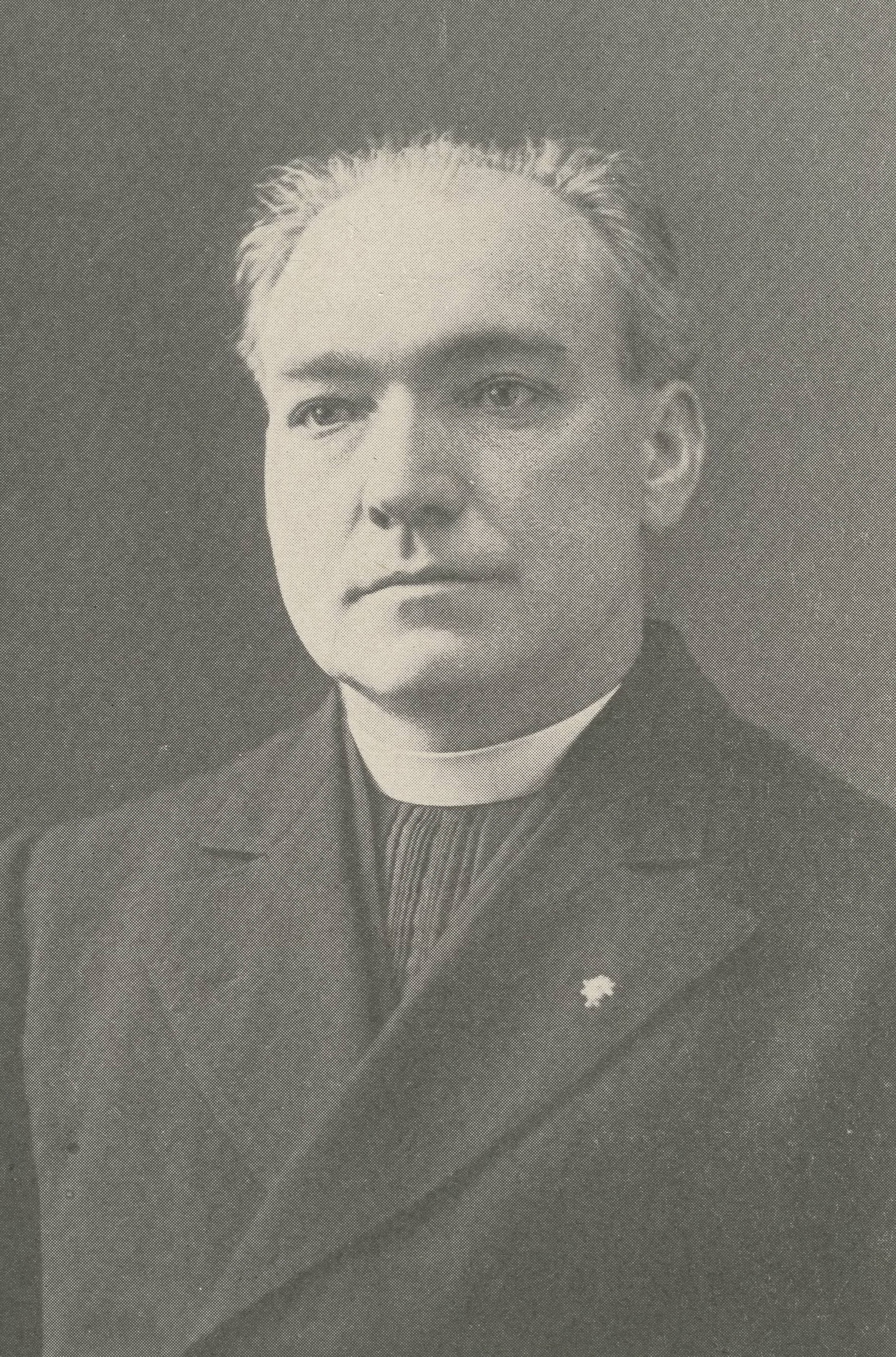
Fr. William McDermott, the founding pastor of Holy Name.

On May 3, 1905, Bishop James Hartley appointed William McDermott to form a new parish in the area of Old North Columbus, beginning at 11th Avenue and taking all portions of the city northward of that point up to Worthington. Later that same month, McDermott purchased eighteen lots on East Patterson for $3500 including interest. Initially McDermott rented a house on the corner of High Street and Patterson, where he lived during the building of the church and rectory, also renting a large room over a hardware store on High Street where he could say Mass. The first of these Masses was on June 4, 1905, and during the sermon McDermott announced that Hartley had decided to name their parish and church after the Holy Name of Jesus.

=== First church ===
By June 1905, the parish had grown such that it was clear a dedicated building could be constructed, and on July 3, 1905, ground was broken for a combined school and church building, with four classrooms on the first floor and a chapel on the second floor. Bishop Hartley laid the cornerstone on August 20, and the building, which cost $43,000, was finished on January 28 of the following year.

That same fall, Fr. McDermott founded a Newman Club for the Catholic students attending the Ohio State University.

In the fall of 1915, Immaculate Conception Parish was erected from the north portion of Holy Name's territory, beginning at Arcadia Avenue.

=== Current church ===
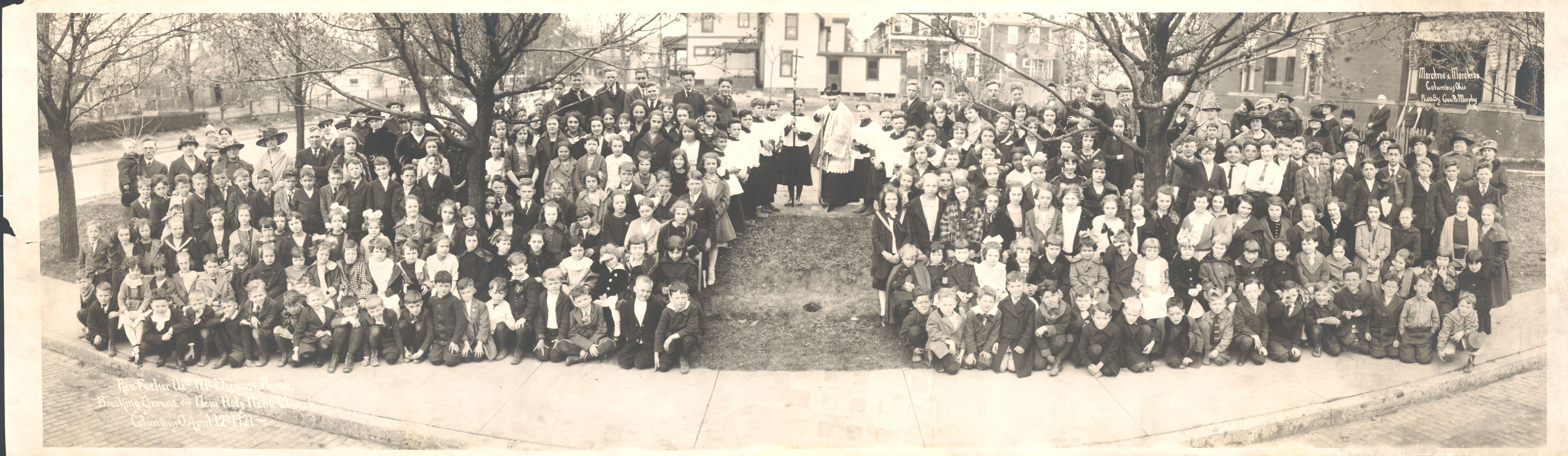
Panoramic photo of the groundbreaking of the present Holy Name Church in 1921.

Continued growth in the area resulted in the need for a larger church, and so on April 12, 1921, work began on the foundation of a larger building. The basement of the current church was finished by Christmas Day of 1921. This foundation was intended for a Gothic church, the plans for which were later deemed too expensive. In June 1922 Fr. McDermott died and Msgr. John O'Neil, then Vicar General of the Diocese, became pastor. O'Neil modified the design for the new church from Gothic to the current Byzantine-Romanesque design as drawn by architect Edward Ramsey, who lived in the parish and did all the design work for free. The church was dedicated on September 11, 1927, and was described as one of the most beautiful in the city of Columbus by Bishop Hartley in 1943 and by Earl K. Fernandes in 2024.

A thunderstorm in August 1953 resulted in a stone cross at the front of the church being struck by lightning and falling to a roof below, as well as major damage to a chimney at the rear of the church. The damage, estimated at $10,000, caused Masses to be said in the basement of the church for a time.

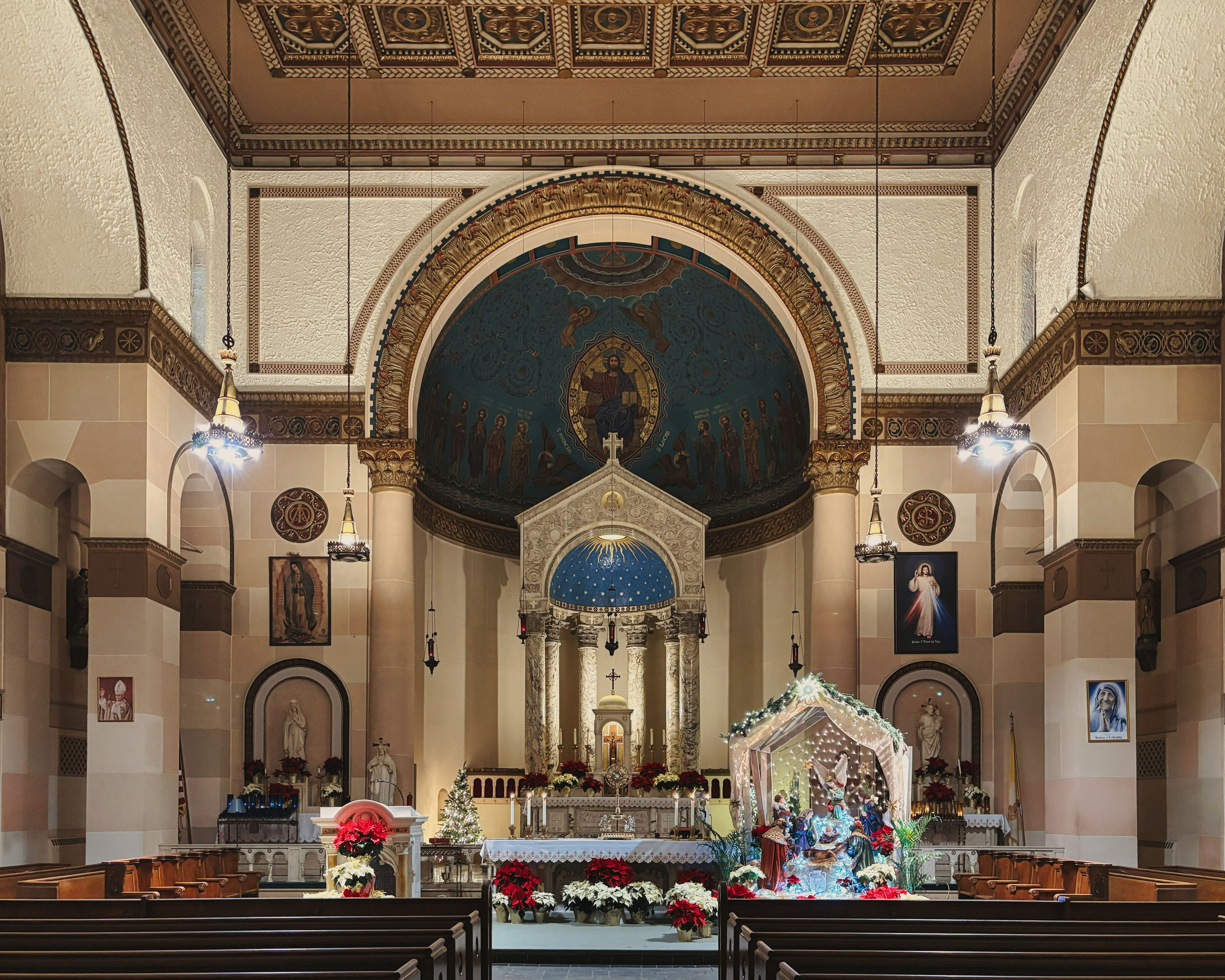
The sanctuary of the current Holy Name Church decorated for Christmas. The altar visible in the center was acquired from Mt. Carmel Hospital in the 1980s.

In 1980, the parish began a five-year restoration plan for the church, undertaking major repairs to the roof and ornate ceiling of the building, as well as repairs to stained glass windows and replastering of walls. In June 1983, the church acquired a marble altar which previously had been in the chapel of Mount Carmel West Hospital. The culmination of this work was celebrated in an 80th anniversary Mass celebrated by Bishop James Griffin in September 1985.

=== Santa Cruz parish ===
A growing Spanish-speaking Catholic population in Columbus, which previously had been served at Holy Cross Church in downtown Columbus since 1993 but had outgrown the space, found a new home at Holy Name in 2001. The move wss in part prompted by a need for space for parish religious education, which could be offered at the Holy Name school building, vacant since 1993. At the time of the move, the Spanish-speaking parish numbered around 600 people.

The personal parish of Santa Cruz was united with the geographic parish of Holy Name on September 1, 2023, under the name Our Lady of Guadalupe, Star of the New Evangelization. The parish continues to be home to a large number of Latino Catholics.

The geographic boundaries of the parish as of 2024 consist of Dodridge Street along with Findley and Arcadia Avenues to the north, the CSX railroad tracks to the east, 11th Avenue to the south, and the Olentangy River to the west.

=== Diocesan shrine ===
Due to the beauty of the church, as well as the frequent offering of the Sacrament of Penance and Eucharistic adoration drawing pilgrims from across the city of Columbus, Bishop Earl K. Fernandes established a diocesan shrine to Our Lady of Guadalupe, Star of the New Evangelization at Holy Name Church on November 18, 2024.

== Holy Name School ==
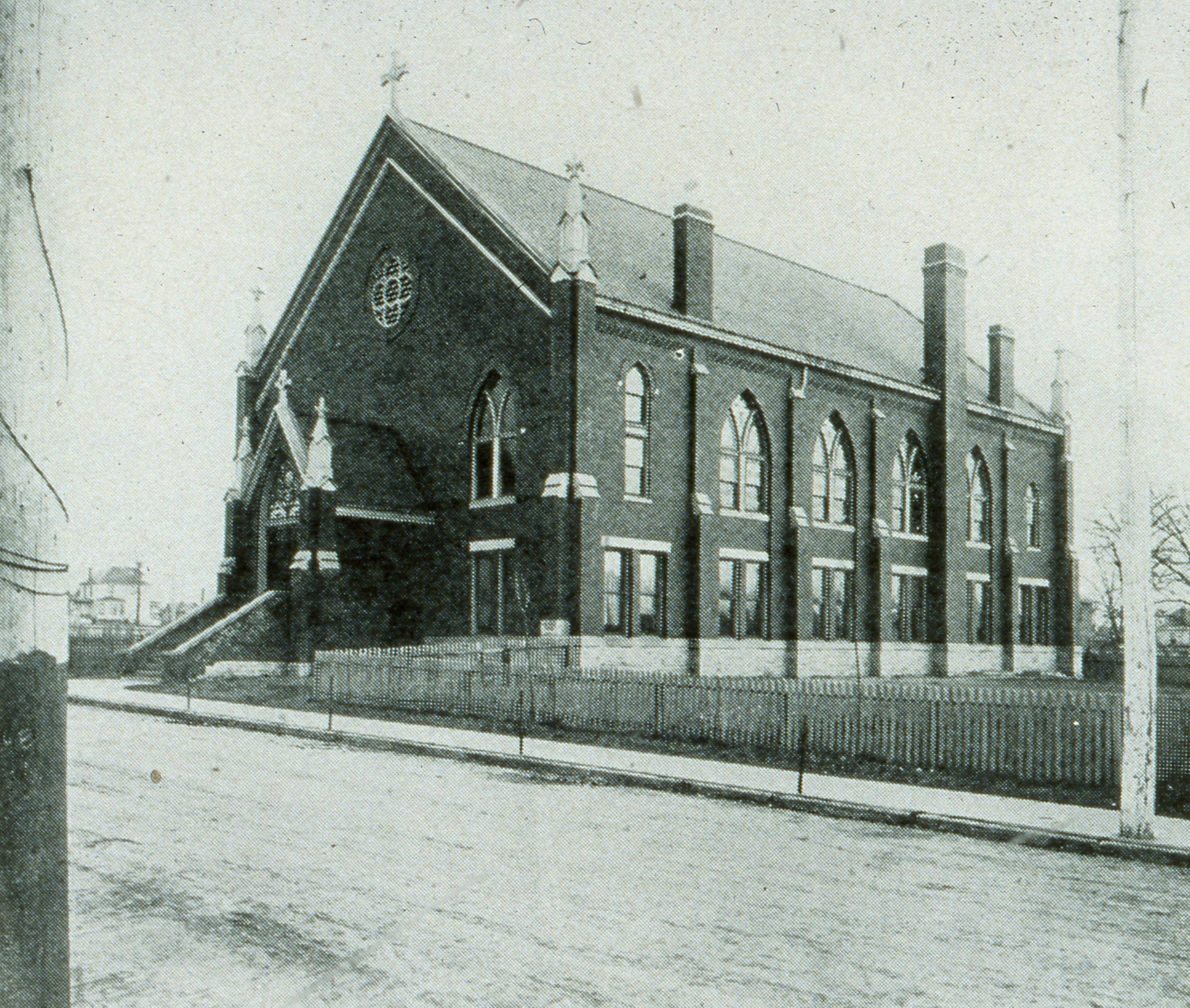
The original 1905 church and school building.

In September 1906 a school was formed for the parish, primarily staffed by Dominican Sisters of the Springs (now Dominican Sisters of Peace), consisting of 52 students and 4 sisters-teachers, using the basement of the original church built in 1905.

In 1954, construction began on a new school with eight classrooms to fit 320 students total, with the old church-school building being converted into a cafeteria. Enrollment at the school surged in 1974 after Sacred Heart School closed and sent its remaining pupils to Holy Name.

In 1993, due to rising operating costs and falling enrollment—in part due to more of the surrounding neighborhood housing students at Ohio State rather than families—Holy Name School closed and sent its remaining pupils to Immaculate Conception School, with the last eight-grade class graduating the same spring.

Since 2001, the school building has housed a clothing bank, food pantry, and meeting space for the Spanish-speaking population of the parish.
