= Liberation of Saint Peter (Raphael) =

Fresco by Raphael

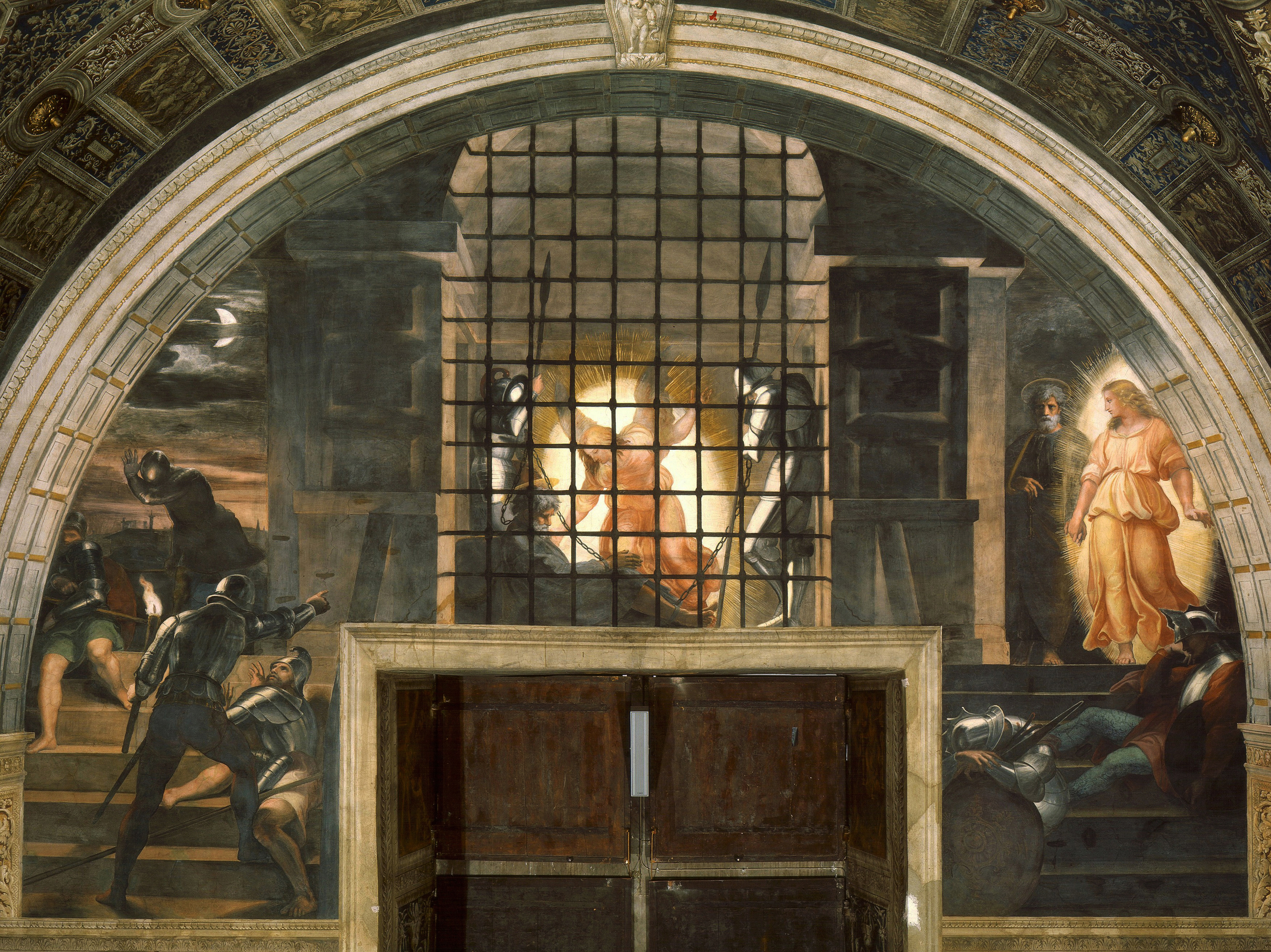
- Artist: Raphael
- Year: 1514
- Type: Fresco
- Dimensions: 560 cm (18 ft 4 in) wide
- Location: Apostolic Palace, Vatican Museums; Vatican City

The Liberation of Saint Peter is a fresco painting by the Italian High Renaissance artist Raphael. It was painted in 1514 as part of Raphael's commission to decorate with frescoes the rooms now known as the Stanze di Raffaello, in the Apostolic Palace in the Vatican. It is located in the Stanza di Eliodoro, which is named after The Expulsion of Heliodorus from the Temple. The painting shows how Saint Peter was liberated from Herod's prison by an angel, as described in Acts 12. It is technically an overdoor.

The fresco shows three scenes in symmetrical balance formed by the fictive architecture and stairs. In the centre the angel wakes Peter, and on the right guides him past the sleeping guards. On the left-hand side one guard has apparently noticed the light generated by the angel and wakes a comrade, pointing up to the miraculously illumined cell. This adds drama to the serene exit of Peter at the right.

== Gallery ==
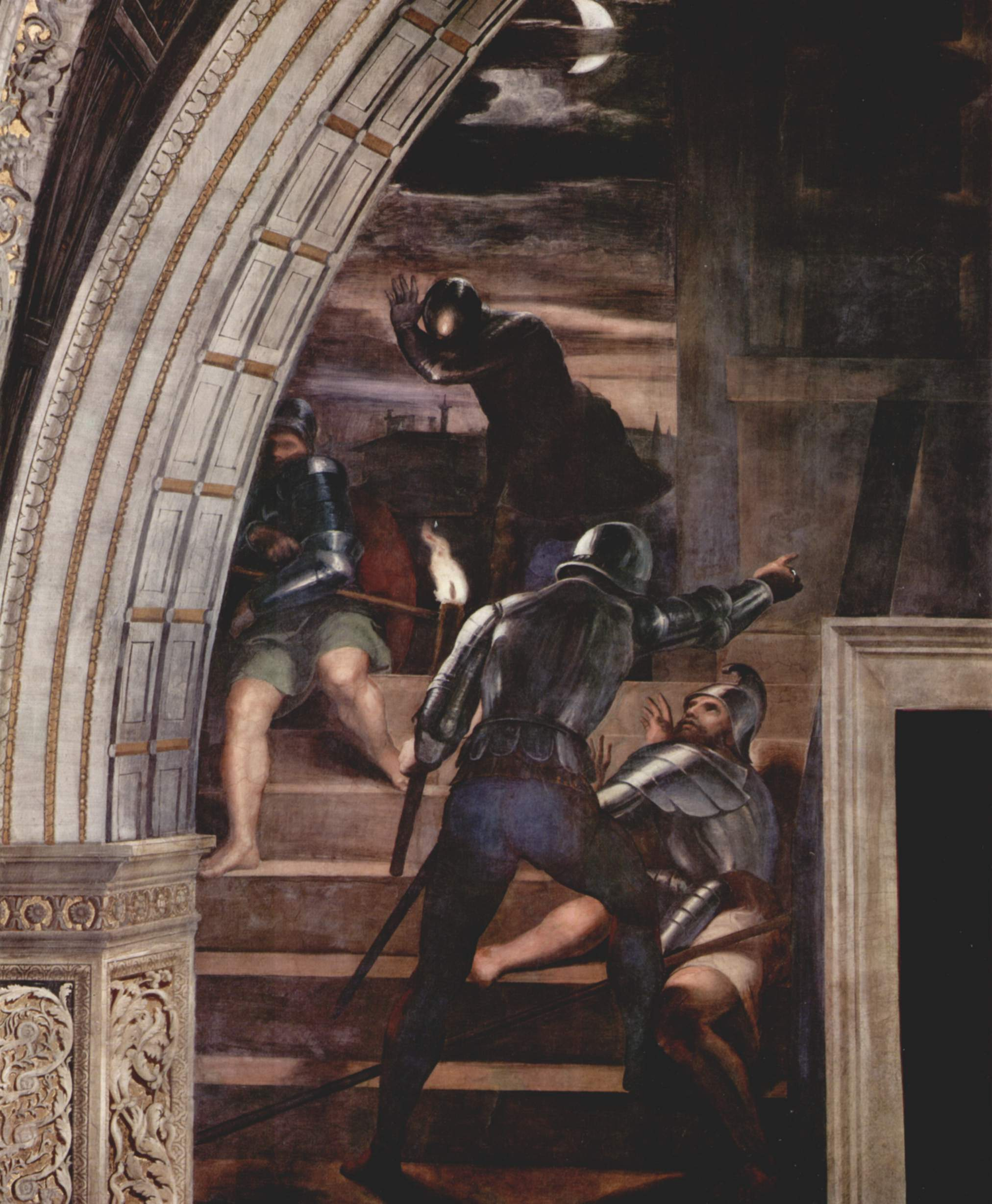

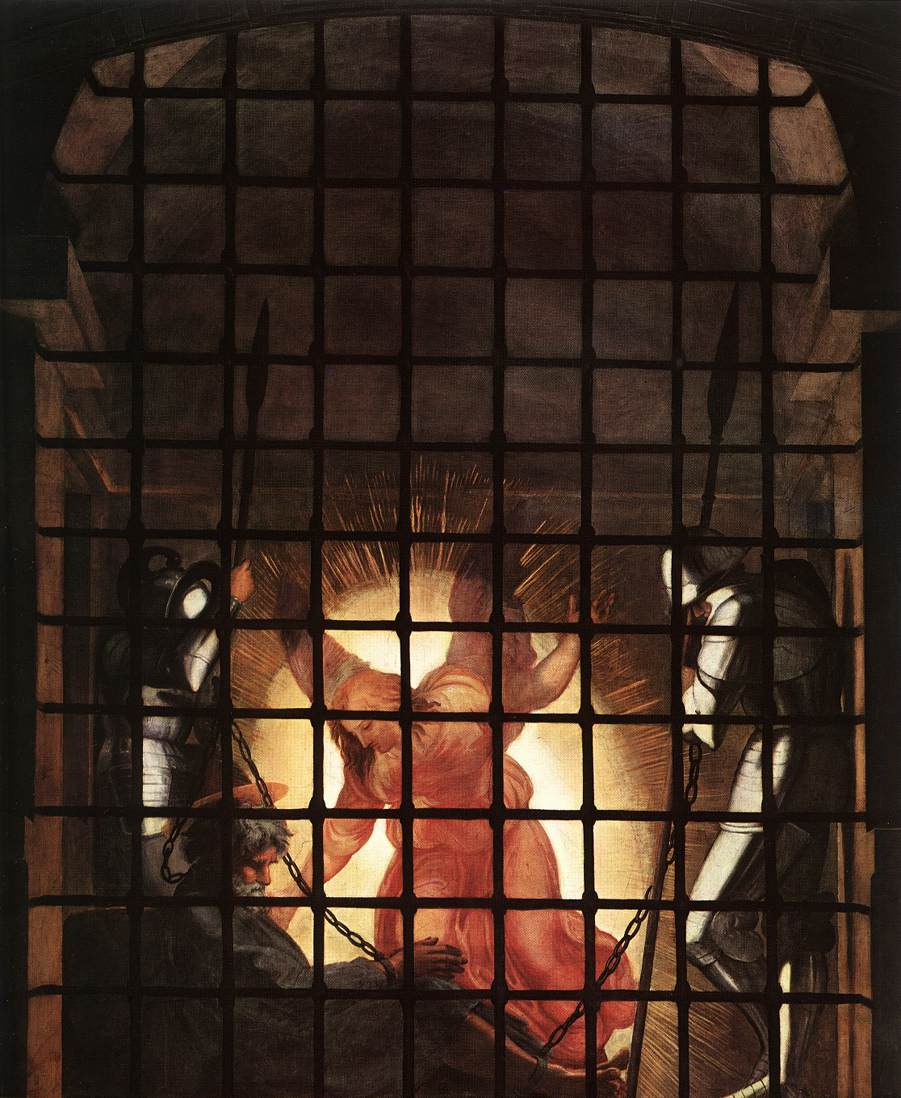

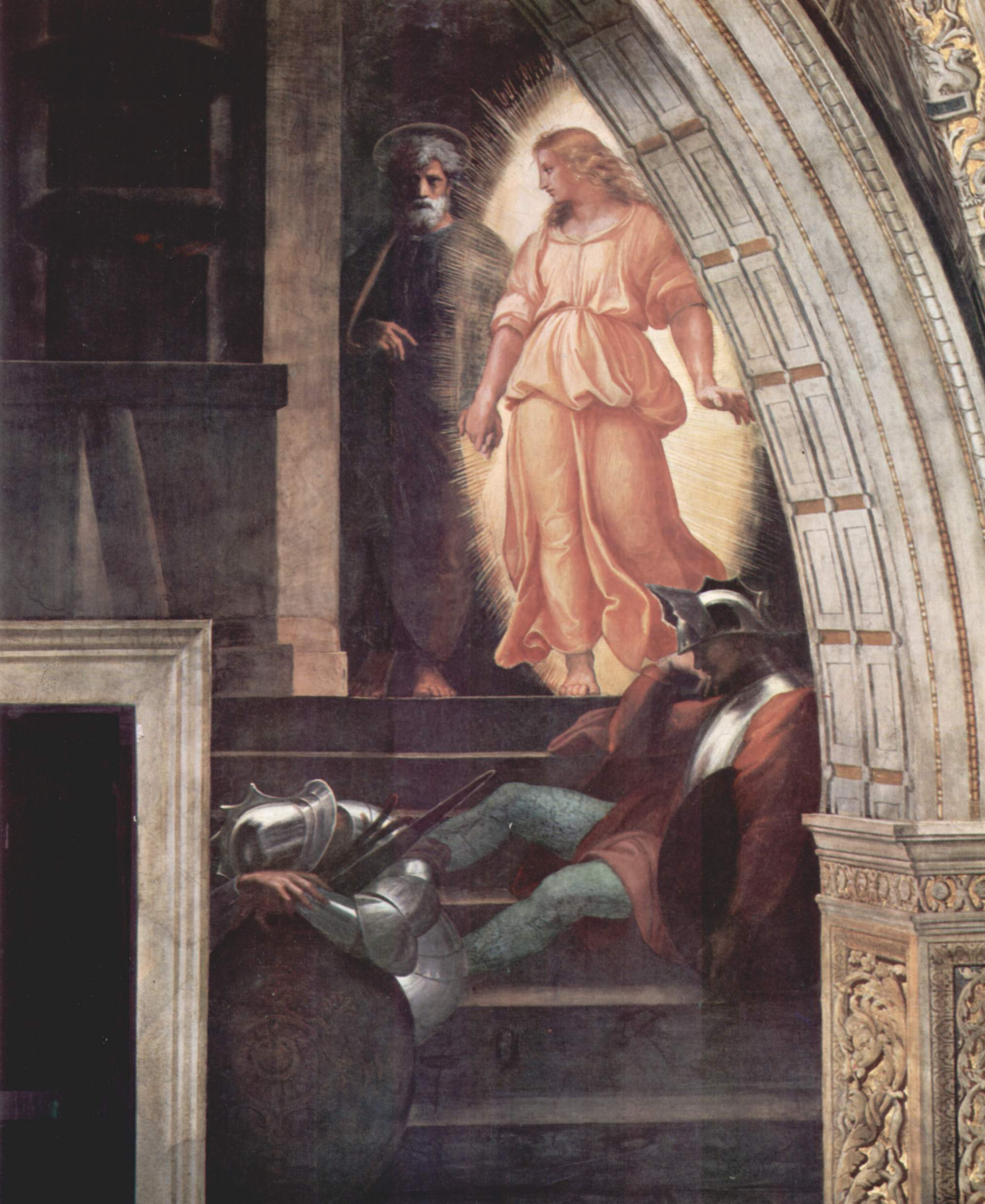
