= Liberation of Saint Peter (Jacopo di Cione) =

Painting by Jacopo di Cione

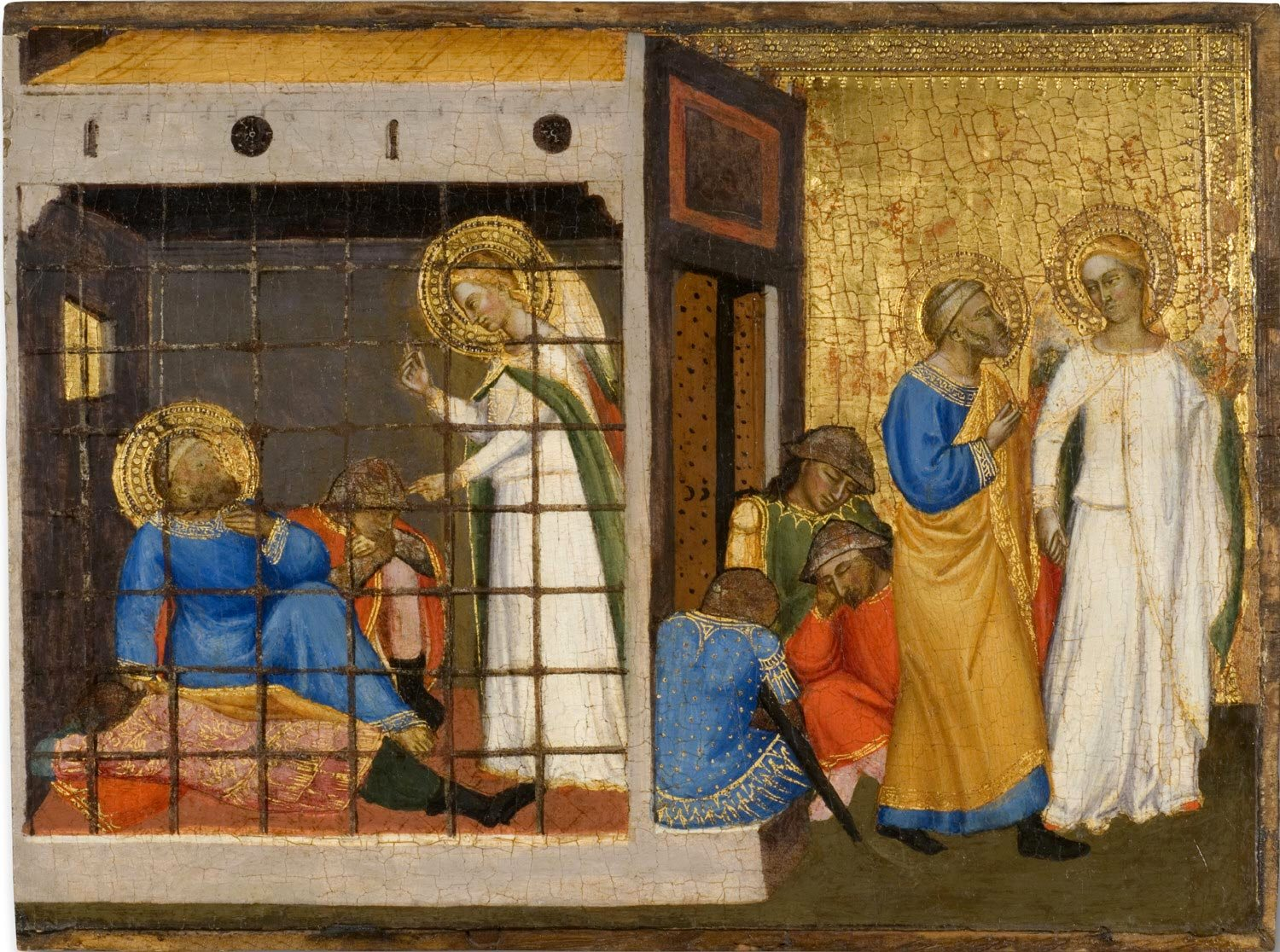
- Artist: Jacopo di Cione
- Year: 1370–1371
- Medium: Tempera and tooled gold on panel
- Dimensions: 38.9 cm × 52.4 cm (15.3 in × 20.6 in)
- Location: Philadelphia Museum of Art

The Liberation of Saint Peter from Prison (or the Deliverance of Saint Peter) is a small predella panel in tempera on wood from a large polyptych painted in 1370–1371 by Jacopo di Cione for the (no longer extant) church of San Pier Maggiore in Florence. It is now part of the collection of the Philadelphia Museum of Art.

The polyptych was designed by Niccolaio and made in collaboration with Matteo di Pacino. This panel forms part of the narrative of the life of Saint Peter on the predella, which included at least five other scenes:

- The Arrest of Saint Peter, at the Rhode Island School of Design Museum of Art, Providence
- Saint Peter Raising the Son of Theophilus, at the Vatican Pinacoteca
- Enthroned Saint Peter as Bishop of Antioch, at the Vatican Pinacoteca
- The Last Meeting of Saints Peter and Paul, formerly part of Thyssen-Bornemisza and Sacerdoti Collections
- The Crucifixion of Saint Peter, at the Vatican Pinacoteca

The upper portions of the altarpiece are now in the National Gallery, London.

The scene depicts the liberation of Peter, an episode from Acts 12:3–19 in which Peter was put into prison in Jerusalem by King Herod, but the night before his trial an angel awoke him while he lay between two guards and "a light shone in the cell". Both the angel and Peter have saintly haloes; the angel has golden hair. The soldiers wear semi-conical caps. Under the angel's escort, Peter's chains fell off and the city gates opened. The scene shows the angel awakening Saint Peter inside the cell, and on the right, leading him by the hand past sleeping guards. Peter was initially incredulous, thinking that it was a dream. He exits the dark cell into a gilded world of freedom.
