= Holy Cross Church (Columbus, Ohio) =

Historic church in Ohio, United States

- Holy Cross Church, Rectory and School
- U.S. National Register of Historic Places
- St. Remigius; Santa Cruz Parish
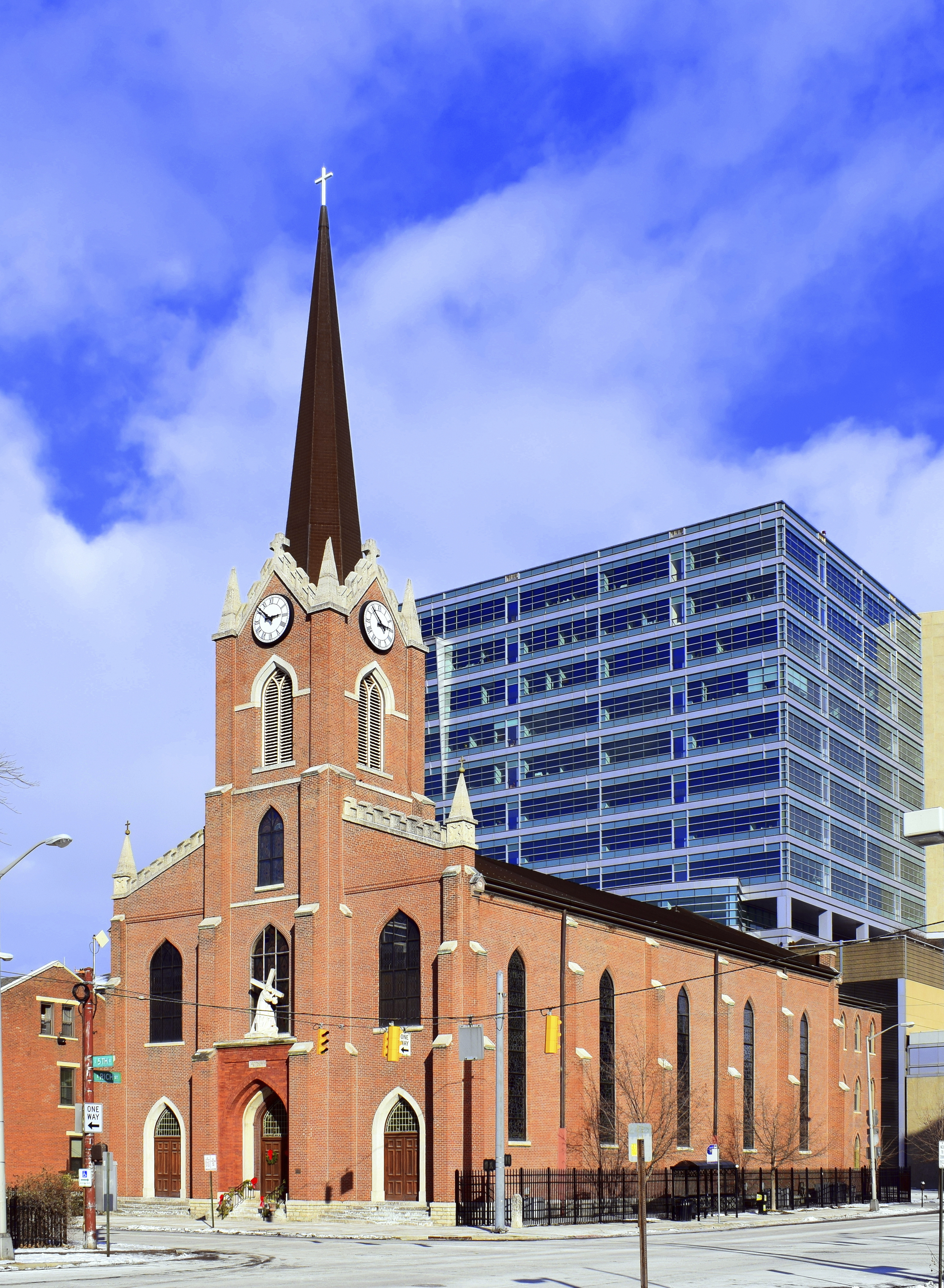
- Interactive map highlighting the church's location
- Location: 212 S. 5th St., Columbus, Ohio
- Coordinates: 39°57′31″N 82°59′35″W
- Area: 0.5 acres (0.20 ha)
- Built: 1848
- Architect: Cornelius Jacobs; George H. Maetzel
- Architectural style: Gothic Revival
- NRHP reference No.: 79001837
- Added to NRHP: April 26, 1979

Holy Cross Church is a historic church of the Diocese of Columbus located in the Discovery District neighborhood of Columbus, Ohio. The Gothic Revival building was completed in 1848 and is the oldest church in Columbus. The church, along with the school and rectory also on the property, was added to the National Register of Historic Places in 1979. The parish was suppressed and its territory absorbed by St. Joseph Cathedral in 2023, but remains open for public Masses.

== History ==
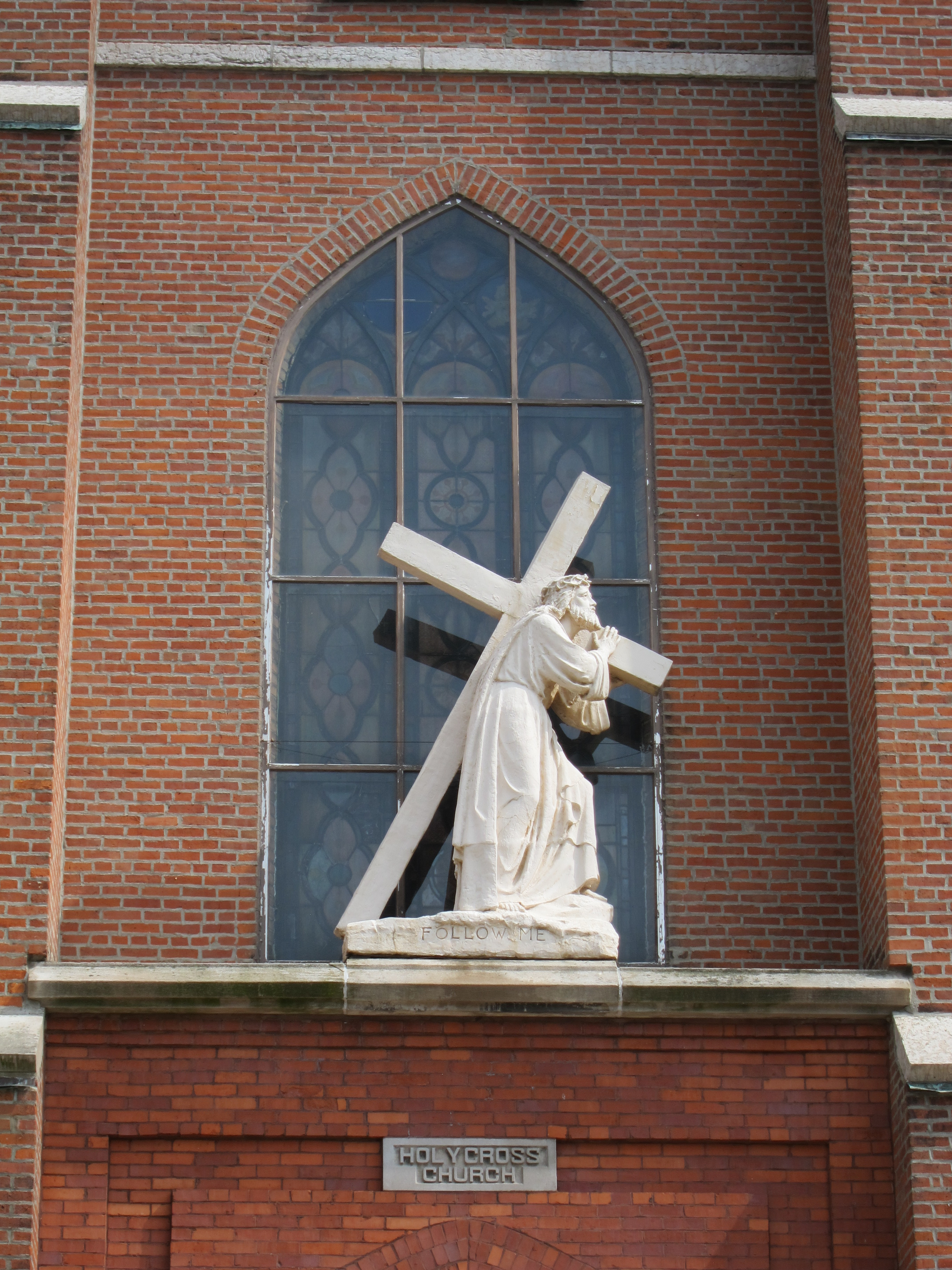
Statue of Christ on the Via Dolorosa on the church exterior

During the early 1800s, the first Catholics in Columbus were visited only occasionally by traveling priests of the Dominican Order. When Father Thomas Martin, OP visited Columbus on May 15, 1833, a group of five local landowners (Samuel and Margaret Crosby, Nathaniel and Caroline Medbury, and Phoebe Otis) met with him and proposed to gift property at Fifth and Walnut streets to the Catholic Church provided that a church building be constructed and in use within five years’ time. That building, Saint Remigius Church, was dedicated on April 29, 1838.

Measuring at just 55 feet long and 30 feet wide, Saint Remigius Church was planned as a temporary place of worship that would later be turned into a school. The pastors at Saint Remigius also served the Catholics in neighboring cities in addition to the parish's own primarily German congregation.

Father William Schonat became the first resident priest in 1843, the same year the first rectory at the site was finished. By then, the growing Catholic population in Columbus necessitated a larger church building. At Father Juncker's request, the parish was renamed “Holy Cross”. The present structure was completed and consecrated by bishop John Purcell on January 16, 1848, just as Irish immigrants began to arrive in Columbus to escape the Great Famine. This influx of migrants eventually split off to form Saint Patrick Church, though they continued to share Holy Cross while the new church was being built.

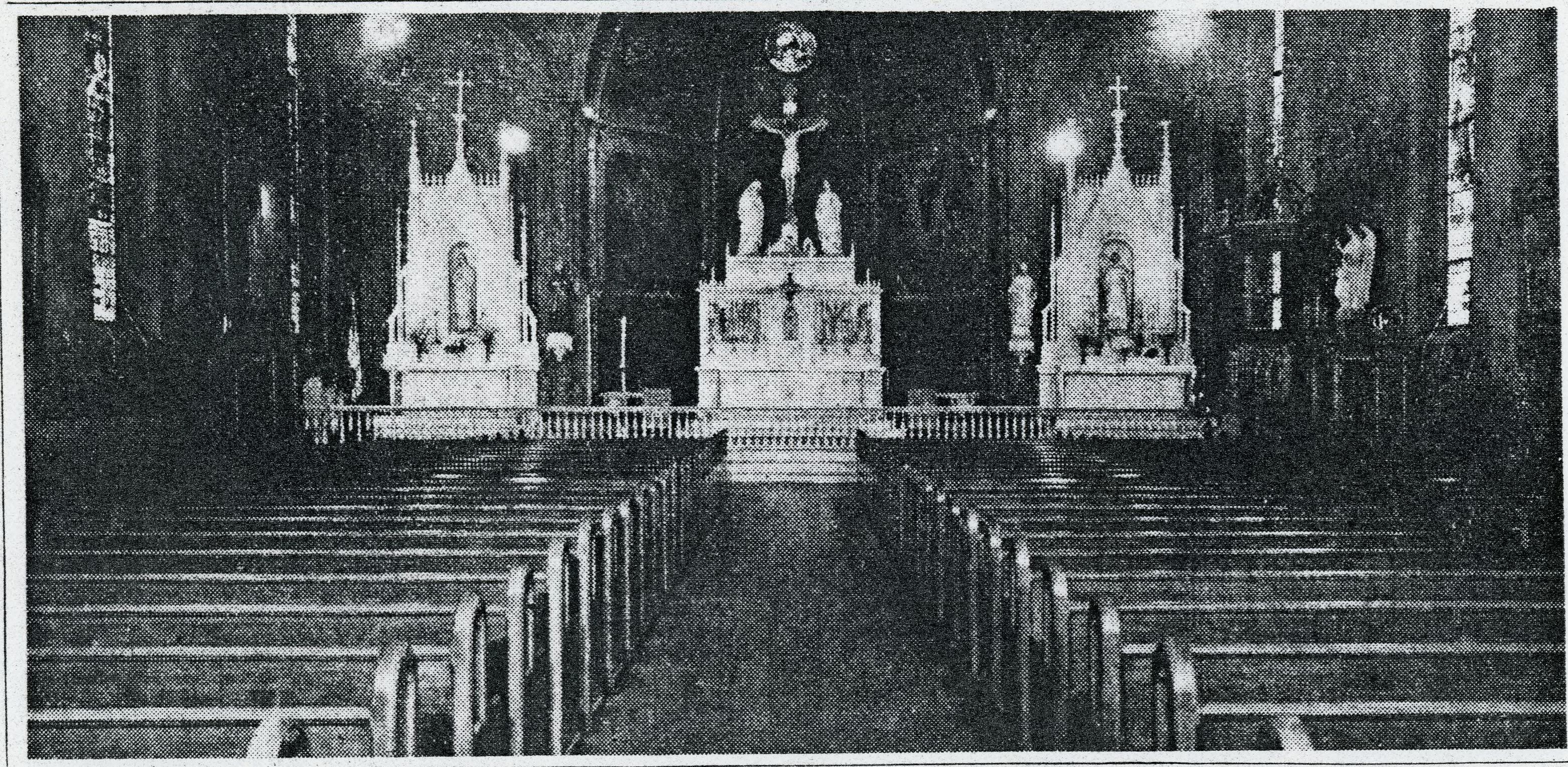
Interior of Holy Cross in 1943.

A fire in June 1877 burned most of the high altar and caused $20,000 of damage. Following repairs, bishop Augustus Toebbe of the Diocese of Covington rededicated the church in 1880.

Columbus native and humorist James Thurber resided in the neighborhood around Holy Cross in his childhood, and made reference to its clock and bell in his works.

=== Holy Cross School ===
A frame school for the parish - the first parochial school in Columbus - was built in 1843, and initially staffed by lay teachers. In 1856, Fr. Casper Borgess, the pastor of the church, brought Sisters of Notre Dame de Namur from Cincinnati to teach, the first religious women to teach in the city. The Sisters of Notre Dame left in 1961 after the closure of the school making their tenure at Holy Cross the longest in the community's history in the United States. Beginning in 1872, the boys of the parish were taught by Marianist brothers from Dayton. The enrollment of the school peaked at about 450 students early in the 1900s, declining following World War I.

=== Santa Cruz parish ===
The first Mass for spanish-speaking immigrants in the Columbus area was offered in 1980, with about 50 people attending. Beginning in 1993, the growing Spanish-speaking Catholic population in Central Ohio was served at Holy Cross by the non-geographic personal parish of Santa Cruz, established by bishop James Griffin. Holy Cross was selected because of its central location for Latinos living in Franklin County. In 2001, due to the congregation's continued growth, its worship site moved to Holy Name Church in the Old North Columbus area.

=== Suppression and merger with St. Joseph Cathedral ===
Citing "demographic changes... a decline in the number of registered parishioners, a decline in Mass attendance, decline in offertory revenue, and the shortage of priests...", bishop Earl Fernandes suppressed the parish and merged its territory with that of St. Joseph Cathedral on April 5, 2023. Holy Cross will continue to serve as a site of worship.

== Exterior ==
The property is located on 0.165 acres at the corner of South 5th and East Rich Streets in Columbus. The church is constructed of over 800,000 bricks. It features a prominent statue of Jesus on the Via Dolorosa with the inscription “Follow Me”, and clock tower with a steeple and belfry. The “Follow Me” statue covers an inscription that reads “God forbid that I should glory, but in the Cross of Our Lord Jesus Christ, by whom the world is crucified to me and I to the world”, a quote from the Epistle to the Galatians.

The rectory and the school were built of brick in 1861 and 1871, respectively.

== Interior ==
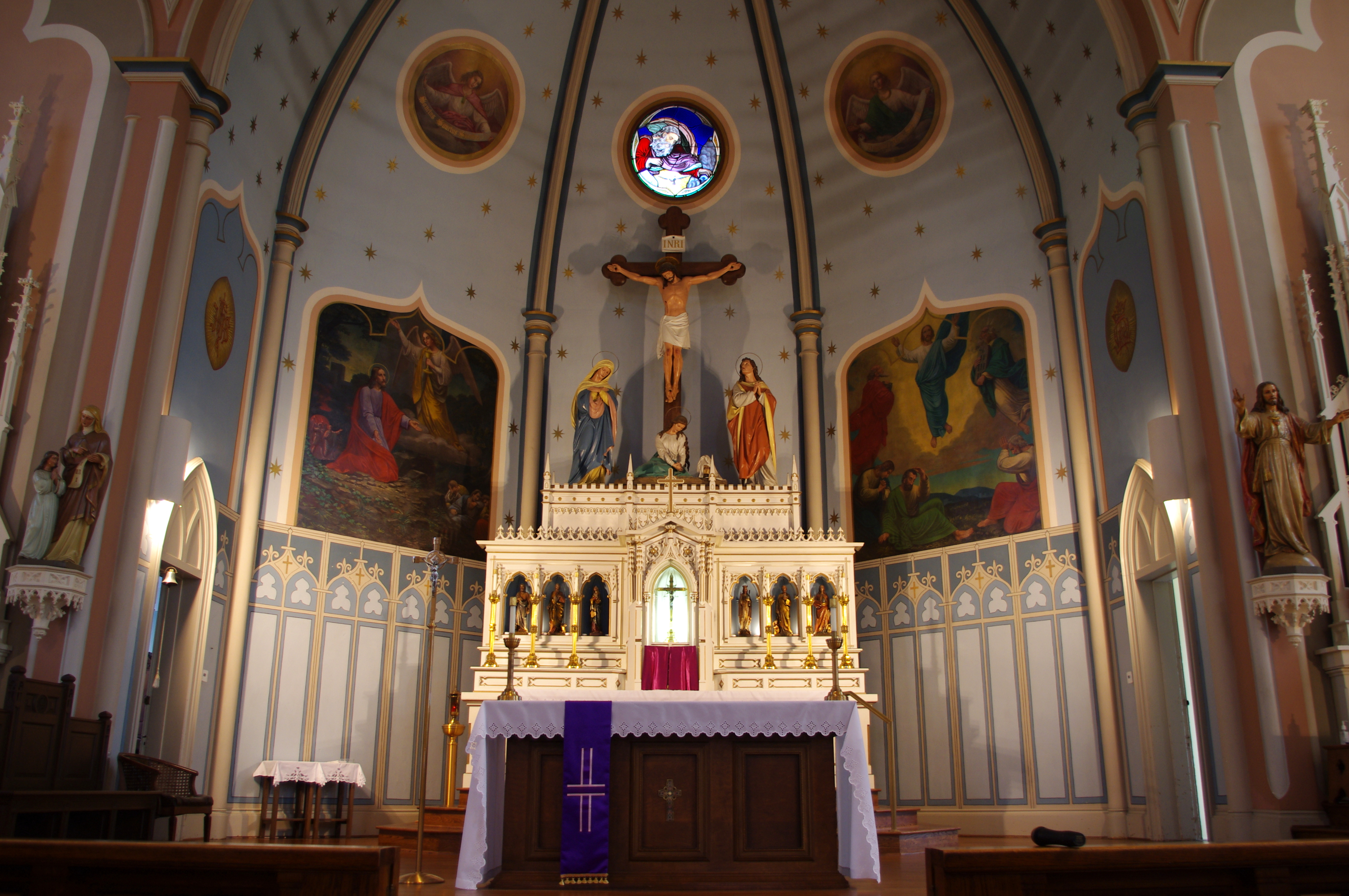
Church sanctuary decorated for Laetare Sunday

The many frescoes in the church were painted in the summer of 1884 for $4200. Two murals near the sanctuary depict Saint Helena finding the True Cross and the presentation of the True Cross to Pope Saint Sylvester. Other murals along the sides of the nave include the Annunciation, the Nativity of Jesus, the Finding in the Temple of the Child Jesus, the Resurrection of Jesus, and the Ascension of Jesus.

The two manual, six rank pipe organ was built by Page Organ Company in 1928. It was installed in the Fayette Theater (Washington Court House, Ohio) before it was moved to Holy Family Church in Franklinton, Ohio in 1947. The organ was moved to Holy Cross in 1981.

The Munich-style stained glass windows were created by Zettler Studios. The windows were stored on a German dock during World War I until they were finally shipped to Columbus after the war.
