= Earl K. Fernandes =

American Catholic prelate (born 1972)

The Most Reverend Earl K. Fernandes STD, DD
- Bishop of Columbus
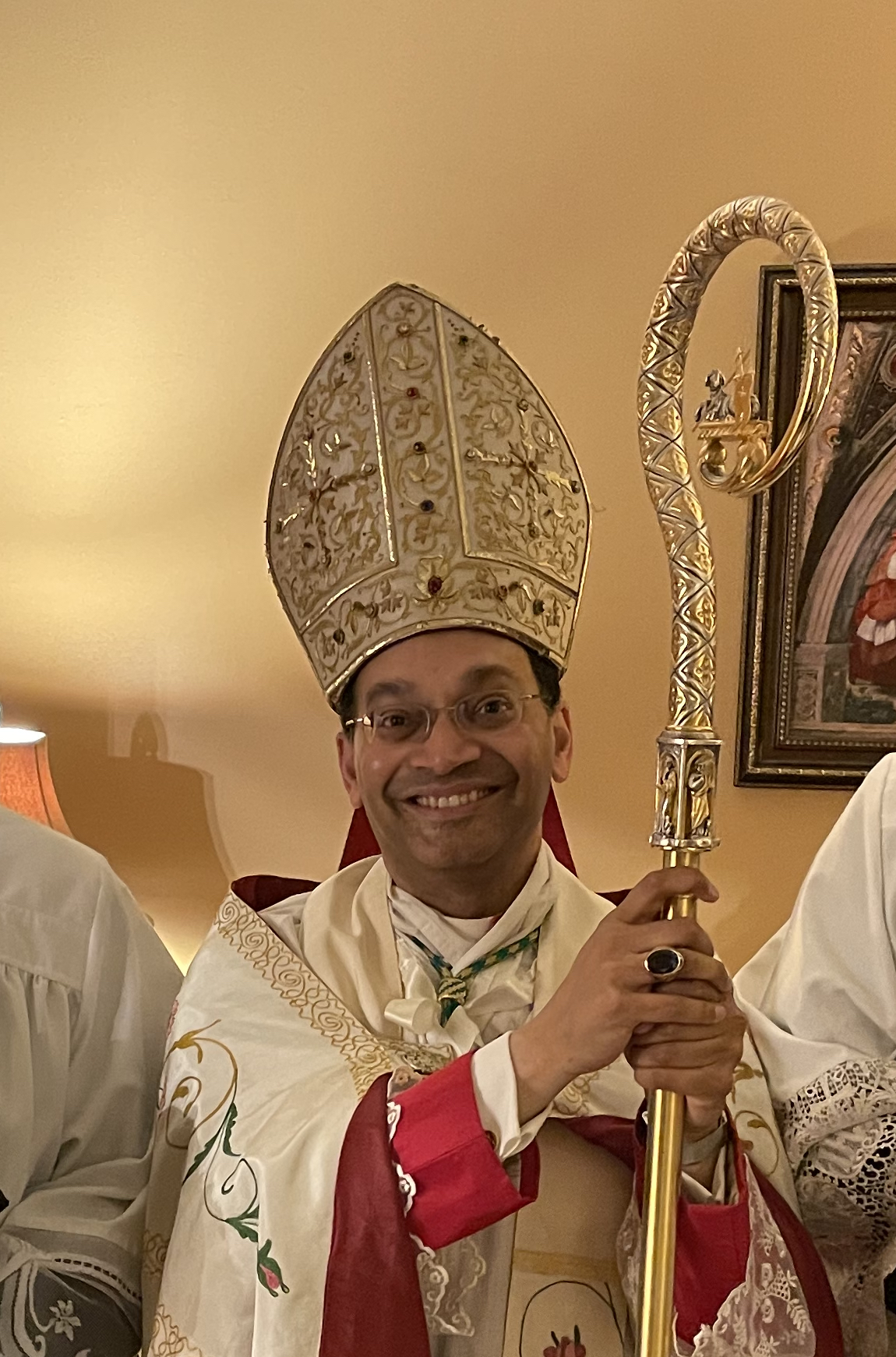
- Fernandes in 2023
- Church: Catholic Church
- Diocese: Columbus
- Appointed: April 2, 2022
- Installed: May 31, 2022
- Predecessor: Robert J. Brennan
- Previous posts: Academic Dean, Mount St. Mary's Seminary; Exorcist, Archdiocese of Cincinnati; Secretary, Apostolic Nunciature to the United States

Orders
- Ordination: May 18, 2002 by Daniel Edward Pilarczyk
- Consecration: May 31, 2022 by Dennis Marion Schnurr, Christophe Pierre and Robert J. Brennan

Personal details
- Born: Earl Kenneth Mario Fernandes; September 21, 1972 (age 54) Toledo, Ohio
- Parents: Sydney and Thelma Fernandes
- Education: University of Toledo; University of Salford; University of Cincinnati; Athenaeum of Ohio; Alphonsian Academy
- Motto: Veni per Mariam (Latin for 'Come through Mary')
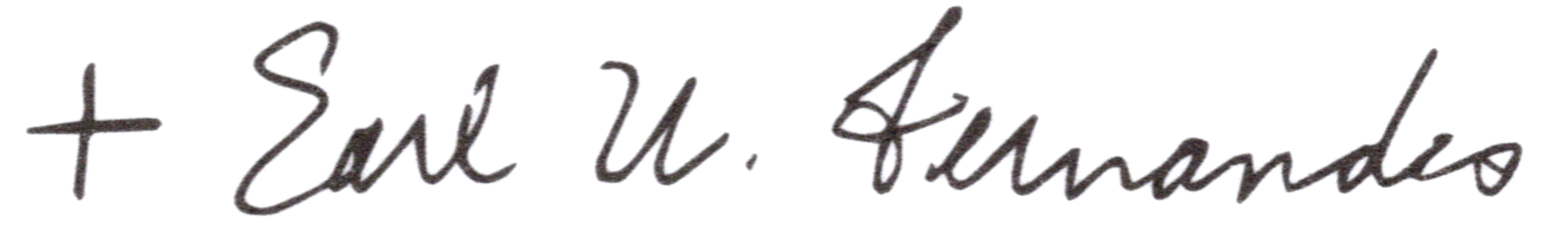
- Signature: Earl K. Fernandes's signature

Ordination history
History
Diaconal ordination
- Ordained by: Daniel Edward Pilarczyk
Priestly ordination
- Ordained by: Daniel Edward Pilarczyk
Episcopal consecration
- Consecrated by: Dennis Marion Schnurr
- Styles
- Reference style: His Excellency; The Most Reverend
- Spoken style: Your Excellency
- Religious style: Bishop

Earl Kenneth Mario Fernandes (born September 21, 1972) is an American Catholic prelate who has served as bishop of the Diocese of Columbus in Ohio since 2022.

Fernandes is the first Indian-American bishop of the Latin Church in the United States, is the first person of color to serve as the bishop of the Diocese of Columbus, and was at the time of his appointment the youngest diocesan bishop in the United States.

== Biography ==
=== Early life ===
Earl Kenneth Mario Fernandes was born on September 21, 1972, in Toledo, Ohio, to Sydney Oswald and Thelma (née Noronha) Fernandes. Thelma was born in Goa and Sydney in Mangalore in India; both parents were raised in Mumbai, India. His parents were Latin Church Catholics who moved to the United States in 1970. Earl Fernandes has four brothers, one of whom is a deacon in the Ukrainian Greek Catholic Church.

The Fernandes family emigrated from India to the United States in 1970, settling in Toledo, where Sydney had gotten a job as a physician and Thelma as a teacher. When Earl Fernandes was a child, his mother started every day with a morning offering prayer. When the family went to visit Sydney while he was working at St. Charles Hospital in Oregon, Ohio, they often found him praying in the hospital chapel in his break time. Sydney frequently offered free medical care to patients.

The Fernandes family attended St. Thomas Aquinas Church in Toledo, a working-class parish that Earl Fernandes says was a second home to him. Thelma made yearly pilgrimages to the Basilica and National Shrine of Our Lady of Consolation in Cary, Ohio. At the shrine, she gave her boys money to light the devotional candles as she wrote down her petitions.

Earl Fernandes attended parochial school at St. Thomas, then went to St. Francis De Sales School in Toledo, graduating as salutatorian in 1990. After high school, Fernandes attended the University of Toledo in Toledo, earning a bachelor's degree in biology in 1994. He then studied physiology for a year at the University of Salford in Salford, England.

During a 1995 trip to Rome, Fernandes said he began to feel a call to the priesthood while praying at the Tomb of Saint Peter in Saint Peter's Basilica. He studied medicine for two years at the University of Cincinnati College of Medicine in Cincinnati, Ohio, before leaving to prepare for the priesthood.

In 1997, Fernandes entered seminary studies at Mount Saint Mary's of the West in Cincinnati. He was ordained a deacon on September 29, 2001. Fernandes earned Master of Theology and Master of Divinity degrees from Mount Saint Mary in 2002.

=== Priesthood ===
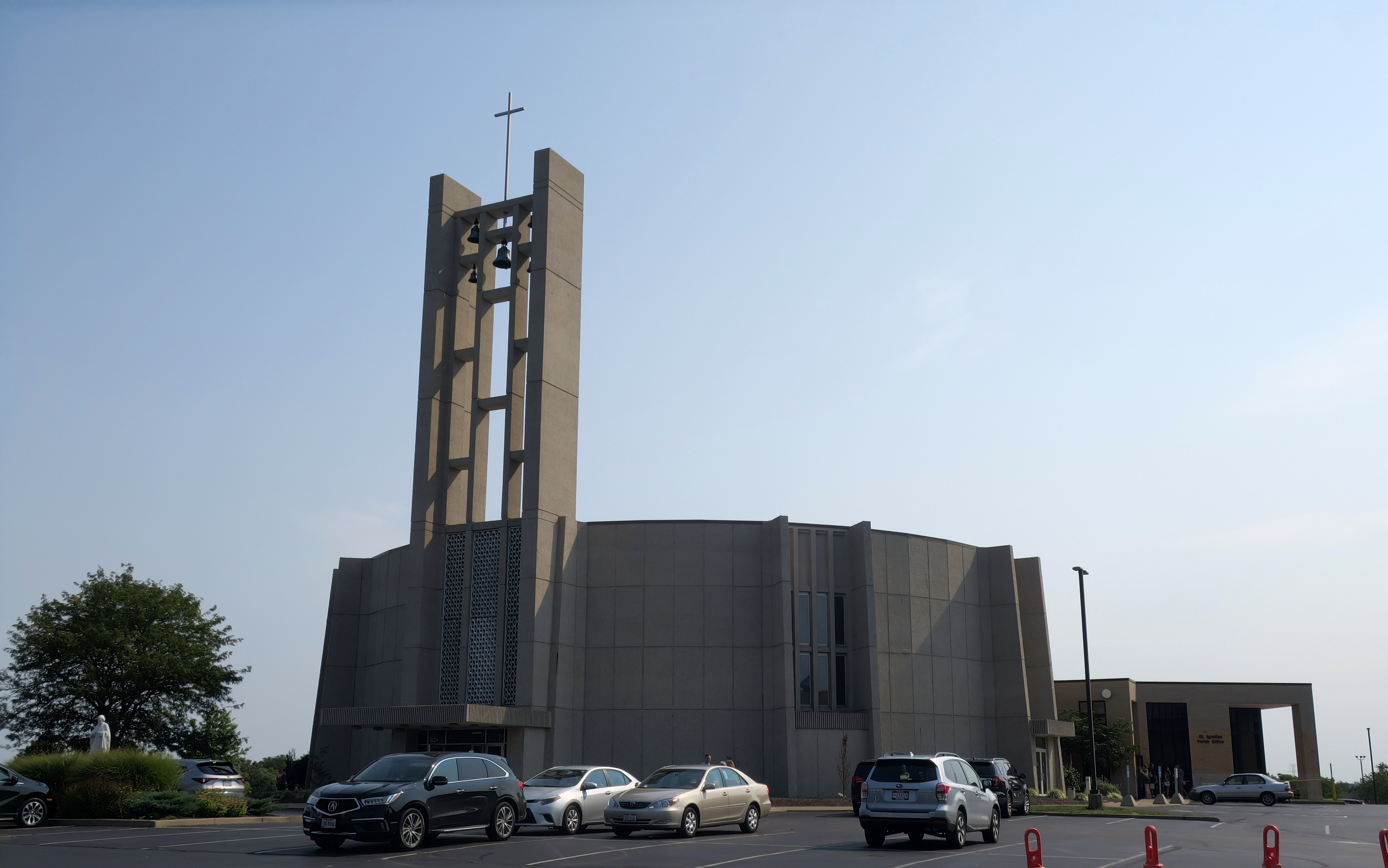
St. Ignatius of Loyola Church (Cincinnati, Ohio) where Fernandes was pastor from 2019 to 2022.

Fernandes was ordained a priest for the Archdiocese of Cincinnati on May 18, 2002, by Archbishop Daniel Edward Pilarczyk at the Cathedral Basilica of St. Peter in Chains in Cincinnati. After his 2002 ordination, the archdiocese assigned Fernandes as parochial vicar of Holy Angels Parish and as a teacher at Lehman Catholic High School in Sidney, Ohio.

In 2004, the archdiocese sent Fernandes to Rome to study at the Alphonsian Academy. He attained his Licentiate in Moral Theology in 2006 and his Doctorate in Moral Theology with a concentration in bioethics in 2007. During this time, he encountered the lay ecclesial movement of Communion and Liberation, and was deeply impacted by it. His episcopal motto is drawn from a prayer of the movement. While in Rome, Fernandes also trained as an exorcist with Carmine De Filippis, an exorcist of the Diocese of Rome.

After returning to Ohio, Fernandes joined the faculty at Mount Saint Mary's Seminary in Cincinnati, later serving as its academic dean. In 2013, he published a book, Seminary Formation and Homosexuality, with the Institute for Priestly Formation. The book defended Pope Benedict XVI's ban of the admission of gay men to Catholic seminaries.

In 2014, the archdiocese assigned Fernandes to serve as parochial administrator of Sacred Heart Parish in Cincinnati. While there, he celebrated the Tridentine Mass along with Mass in Italian and English. He later said most of the attendees of the Tridentine Mass were young people, whom Fernandes characterized as:

... Looking for reverence and beauty, a sense of transcendence, and to be connected to their parents and grandparents, the generations of faith... The Latin Mass is also quiet. There’s so much noise and business in our lives. They enter into the liturgies interiorly and love it for its tradition, the Faith of their fathers.

Fernandes was named a Missionary of Mercy by Pope Francis for the Extraordinary Jubilee of Mercy in 2014. In 2016, Fernandes went to Washington D.C. to serve as secretary to the Apostolic Nuncio to the United States, Archbishop Carlo Maria Viganò. When Vigano was replaced later that year by Archbishop Christophe Pierre, Fernandes remained as secretary.

Fernandes returned to Cincinnati in 2019 to become pastor of St. Ignatius Loyola Parish in Cincinnati. His predecessor had resigned due to a rape allegation. Parishioners at St. Ignatius spoke highly of Fernandes and his management of St. Ignatius following the other priest's removal.

Fernandes also served as a judge on the archdiocesan marriage tribunal and as a board member of the Pontifical College Josephinum in Columbus, Ohio. Fernandes was active in the Beacons of Light program in the archdiocese, which sought to consolidate its 208 parishes into 57 clusters, each with one priest.

=== Bishop of Columbus ===
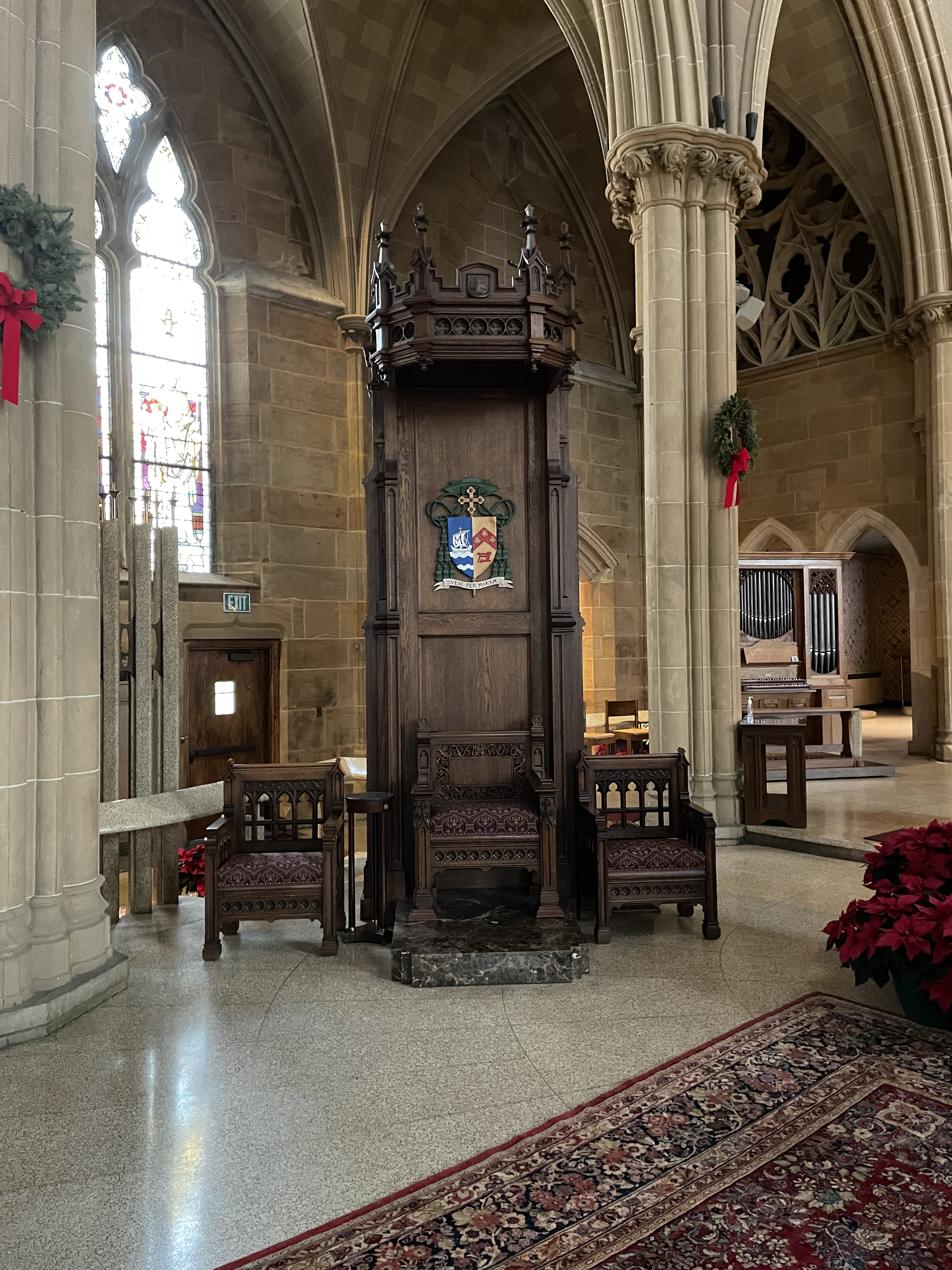
The cathedra at St. Joseph Cathedral with Fernandes' ecclesiastical arms.

On April 2, 2022, Fernandes was appointed the 13th bishop of Columbus by Pope Francis. Fernandes was consecrated by Archbishop Dennis Schnurr, with Archbishop Pierre and Bishop Robert J. Brennan serving as co-consecrators, on May 31, 2022, at St. Paul the Apostle Church in Westerville, Ohio. Fernandes was the first Indian-American bishop to serve in the United States, as well as the first person of color to serve as bishop of Columbus.

In July 2022, Fernandes assigned a diocesan priest to run the Newman Center of Ohio State University in Columbus. The Newman Center had been run by the Paulist Fathers for the past 65 years. According to the diocese, it took control of the center to align it more closely with the objectives of the diocese and to promote the addition of new Catholic lay organizations, including Opus Dei and Courage International. The Paulists then decided to leave the Newman Center completely. Previously, the Paulist Fathers-led ministry at the Newman Center featured "a year-round resident community of retirees and middle-aged adults with children." In 2024, the director of the OCIA program at the Newman Center recognized the new diocesan director's support of the OCIA program as accounting "for the pretty tremendous growth that’s happening there and the number of students who are being brought in." In a 2025 interview with Catholic World Report, Fernandes noted that he "took some heat" for assigning diocesan priests to run the chaplaincy, but noted that "it is bearing fruit. We’re seeing young men interested in becoming diocesan priests."

In September 2023, Fernandes announced the closing of 11 parishes in Columbus due to low Mass attendance. The diocese experienced a notable growth in priestly vocations during Fernandes' episcopacy, more than doubling from 17 in 2022 to 37 in 2024.

Fernandes is a fourth-degree Knight of Columbus, as well as a member of the National Catholic Bioethics Center in Philadelphia, Pennsylvania.

== Distinctions ==
=== Foreign orders ===
- Holy See: Knight of the Order of the Holy Sepulchre

== See also ==
- Catholic Church hierarchy
- Catholic Church in the United States
- Historical list of the Catholic bishops of the United States
- List of Catholic bishops of the United States
- Lists of patriarchs, archbishops, and bishops

== Episcopal succession ==
Catholic Church titles
Preceded by Robert J. Brennan	Bishop of Columbus; 2022-Present	Succeeded by Incumbent
