= St. Therese Retreat Center =

Church, retreat center, and convent located in Columbus, Ohio

Coordinates: 39°58′36″N 82°51′36″W

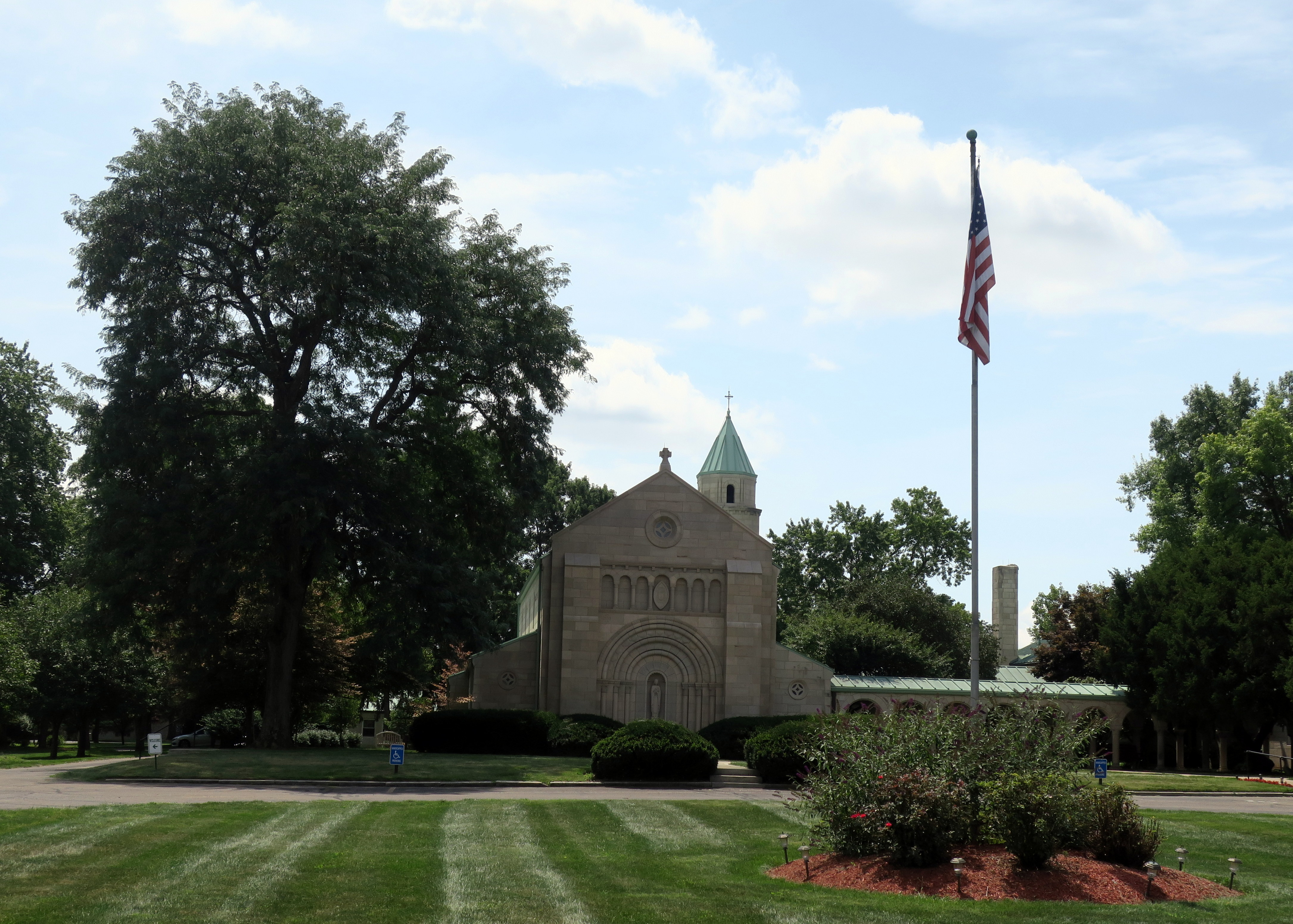
- St. Therese Retreat Center
- Address: 5277 East Broad Street; Columbus, OH, 43213
- Denomination: Catholic

History
- Former name(s): St. Therese’s Shrine, House of Retreats; Shrine Center for Renewal

Architecture
- Architect: Robert Krause
- Architectural type: Romanesque
- Completed: 1931

Administration
- Diocese: Columbus

Clergy
- Bishop: Earl K. Fernandes

St. Therese Retreat Center is a retreat house and shrine of the Catholic Diocese of Columbus dedicated to Thérèse of Lisieux located on East Broad Street in Columbus, Ohio.

== History ==
=== Founding ===
In 1925, Bishop James Hartley purchased a house and 77 acres of land which had formerly belonged to Martha Green Deshler, daughter of the prominent Columbus businessman John G. Deshler who owned the Deshler Hotel and financed the building of the Wyandotte Building, the first skyscraper in Columbus. Green Deshler and her husband, Harry W. Brown, settled at the farmhouse following their marriage, and Green died at the house in September of 1925.

It served as a home for devotional exercises and Sunday Masses from 1925 to 1926, and the site was entrusted to the care of the Sisters of St. Francis of Penance and Christian Charity, on August 28, 1927, and remained so until 1971.

=== Improvements ===
A Romanesque chapel with a capacity for 120 congregants dedicated to St. Therese, along with a 32-room dormitory for retreat participants and other buildings designed by Robert Krause, was constructed in 1931 and dedicated on the feast of St. Therese by Bishop Hartley.

In 1949, Bishop Michael Ready of Columbus oversaw the addition of murals to the chapel including depictions of the Temptation of Christ, the prophet Elijah in the desert, and Ignatius of Loyola and Charles Borromeo, both patrons of the retreat movement, along with the apse painting of Pentecost as recounted in Acts 2.

The shrine was strongly affiliated with both the Lay Men's and Lay Women's Retreat Leagues, who also sponsored the construction of the on-site rosary walk, a new residential wing, and the air conditioning of the main chapel in 1959 with the encouragement of bishop Clarence Issenmann. The inaugural retreat of 55 men following these improvements, in May of 1960, required the premature use of the new residential wing. The new wing and other additions were formally dedicated in the fall of the same year.

=== Alternate Uses ===
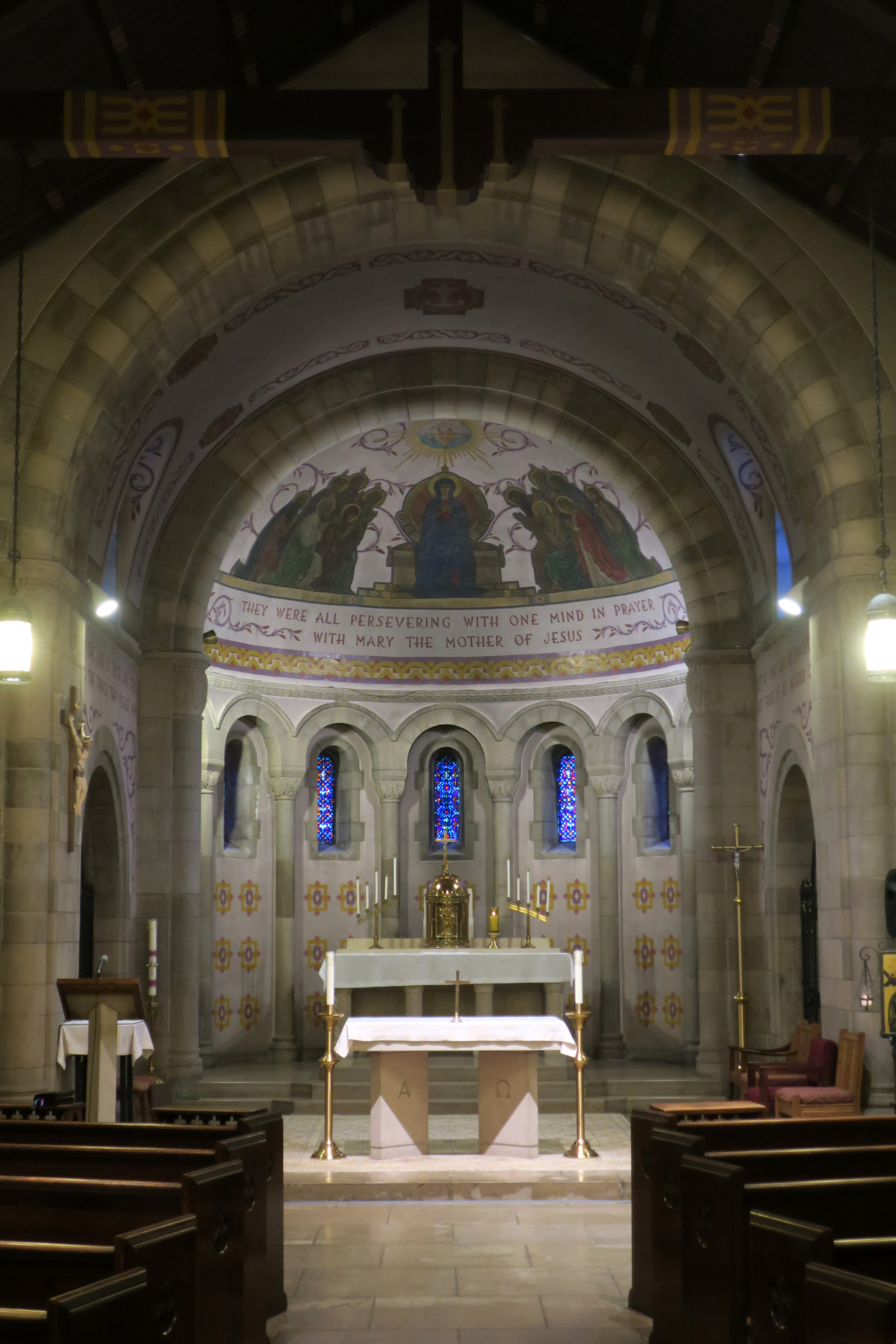
The chapel at St. Therese Retreat Center

In 1970, the name of the facility was changed to the "Shrine Center for Renewal" and more ecumenical uses of the shrine became common, with local Protestant groups using the facility. The chapel was the site of celebrations of the Tridentine Mass in the 1990s. In 1998, 18 of the original 75 acres were split off to be developed into a senior assisted living facility run by the Carmelite Sisters for the Aged and Infirm. It also hosted a three-day gathering of Catholics and Sikhs sponsored by the USCCB in May 2014. The same year, the grotto dedicated to Our Lady of Lourdes on the grounds of the facility was rebuilt and restored.

In 2020, citing declining use, the Diocese of Columbus closed the retreat center, but in October of 2022, it began to serve as temporary housing for a new order of religious sisters serving in the Diocese.
