= William G. Deshler =

American financier, real estate developer, and philanthropist (1852–1929)

William Green Deshler
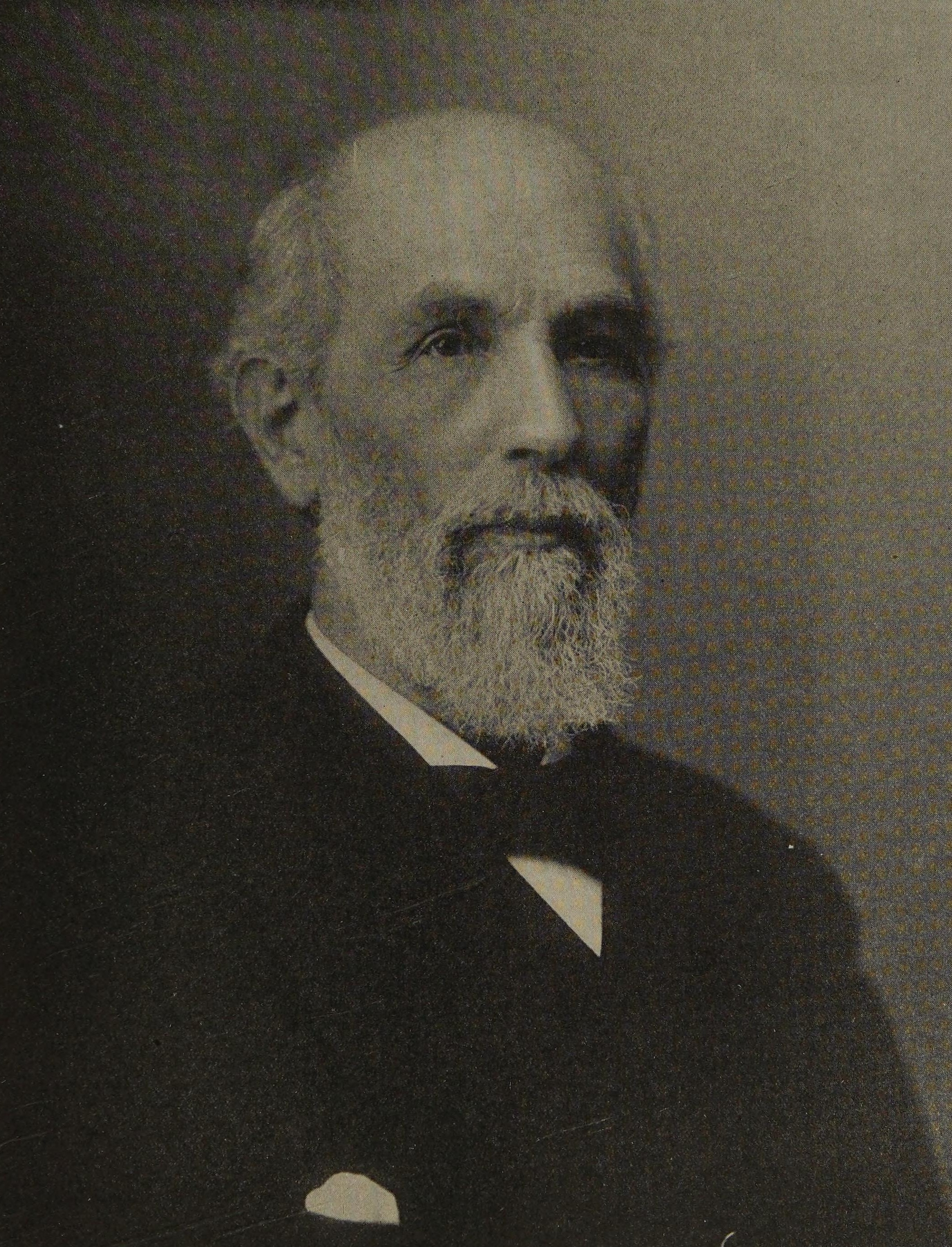
- Born: May 24, 1827; Columbus, Ohio, U.S.
- Died: February 16, 1916 (aged 88)
- Occupations: Financier; Real estate developer Philanthropist
- Children: John G. Deshler
- Parents: David Deshler (father); Betsy Green (mother)

William Green Deshler (May 24, 1827 – February 16, 1916) was an American financier, real estate developer, and philanthropist.

== Biography ==
=== Early life ===
Deshler was born in Columbus, Ohio, on May 24, 1827, the son of David Deshler and Betsy Green. After being was educated in private schools in Columbus and Eastern Pennsylvania, he began working at the Clinton Bank. He continued in the banking business, eventually founding the Deshler National Bank. He married his first wife, Olive Clark, in the summer of 1848, although she died 6 months later at the age of 19. The first monument in Green Lawn Cemetery is dedicated to her.

The same year he completed the building of a home in downtown Columbus. William's second wife, Ann Eliza Sinks, gave birth to his first son, John G. Deshler, in December 1852.

=== Career and contributions to the city of Columbus ===
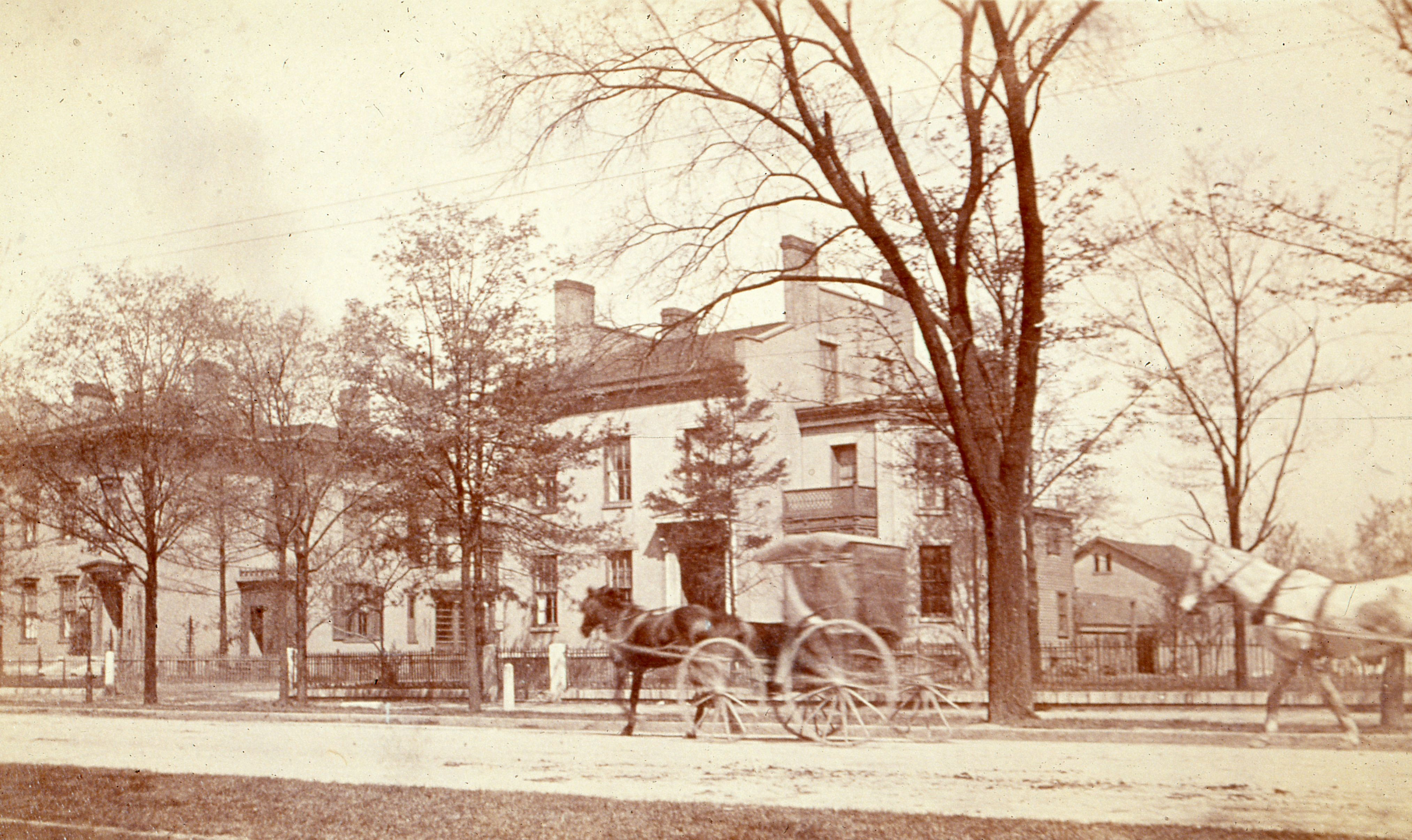
1891 photograph of the first Deshler home

In 1857, following a visit to Havana and seeing the tree-lined streets of that city, Deshler funded the planting a double row of trees along East Broad Street. Two years later, Deshler sold his home and moved to a larger property at Broad and Third streets. The original 1848 home would eventually be purchased by Bishop John Watterson in 1879 and serve as the residence of the bishop of the Diocese of Columbus until its destruction in 1948 to make way for a new rectory on the same site, adjoining St. Joseph Cathedral.

Following the outbreak of the American Civil War, Deshler served as an advisor to Treasury Secretary Salmon P. Chase, being unable to go to the front and fight due to ill health. Especially notable was his work in acquiring a reduced price for food and lodging for volunteers for the Union army. In 1863 he was a member of the delegation that went to Washington to advocate for the establishment of the armory that would become Fort Hayes.

Deshler also advised on the construction of the current Trinity Episcopal Church beginning in 1866. In April of the following year, Deshler, along with Allen G. Thurman, sold a tract of land then known as Stewart's Grove—now known as Schiller Park—to the city of Columbus for $15,000. In the late 1870s, Deshler served as a member of the board of and assisted in founding the Hocking Valley Railroad.

In 1878, Deshler oversaw the construction of the Deshler Block, two four-story buildings on the corner of Broad and High streets, which housed the Deshler Bank and other businesses. These were built on land which had been acquired by William's father, David Deshler, for $1,000 in 1817.

By 1900, most of the day-to-day work of the Deshler family businesses passed to William Deshler's son, John G. Deshler, but William was a major advocate and force behind his son's building of the Deshler Hotel on the land then occupied by the Deshler Block.

=== Philanthropy and death ===
In the 1880s, Deshler created a fund of $33,000, in memory of his daughter, Kate Deshler Hunter, to financially assist special maternity cases in the care of the Columbus Female Benevolent Society. He also contributed $100,000, to the Female Benevolent Society in memory of his mother, Betsy Green Deshler. Two years later he contributed $17,000 more for the use of orphans and other destitute children. These funds are now managed by the Columbus Foundation, and constitute one of the oldest charitable funds in the state of Ohio. Deshler died on February 16, 1916.
