= Edward Gerard Hettinger =

American bishop

The Most Reverend Edward G. Hettinger
- Auxiliary Bishop of Columbus; Titular Bishop of Teos
- Church: Catholic Church
- See: Teos
- Appointed: December 6, 1941
- In office: February 24, 1942 - October 14, 1977

Orders
- Ordination: June 2, 1928 by James Joseph Hartley
- Consecration: February 24, 1942 by James Joseph Hartley

Personal details
- Born: October 14, 1902 Lancaster, Ohio, U.S.
- Died: December 28, 1996 (aged 94) Columbus, Ohio, U.S.
- Education: College of the Holy Cross; Saint Vincent Seminary

Edward Gerard Hettinger (October 14, 1902 - December 28, 1996) was an American prelate of the Catholic Church in the United States. He served as auxiliary bishop of the Diocese of Columbus in Ohio from 1942 to 1977.

== Biography ==
=== Early life ===
Edward Hettinger was born on October 14, 1902, in Lancaster, Ohio, to Edward and Clara (O'Brien) Hettinger. His father was a saloon-keeper of French and German descent and his mother's parents were from Ireland. He was baptized and confirmed in the Basilica of St. Mary of the Assumption in Lancaster and attended the school associated with that parish.

Deciding to become a priest, Hettinger first entered the College of the Holy Cross in Worcester, Massachusetts. He continued his studies at Saint Vincent Seminary in Latrobe Pennsylvania.

=== Priesthood ===
Hettinger was ordained a priest by Bishop James Joseph Hartley for the Diocese of Columbus on June 2, 1928. After his ordination, the diocese assigned Hettinger as chaplain of St. Ann Hospital in Westerville, Ohio while residing at the St. Vincent Orphanage in Columbus. He began working in the diocesan chancery in 1933, and was named chancellor in 1938. That same year, he was named a domestic prelate by Pope Pius XII.

=== Auxiliary Bishop of Columbus ===
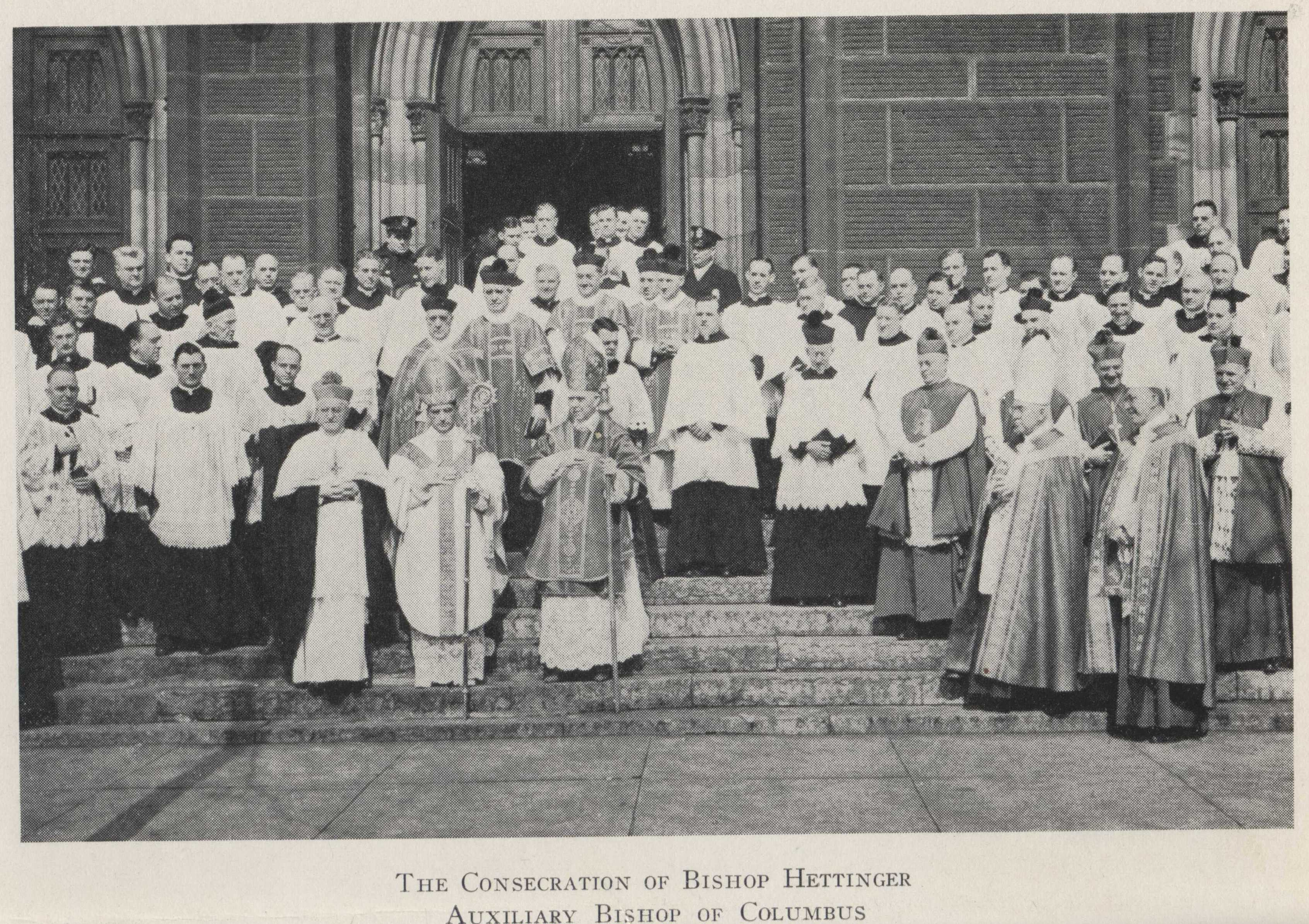
Hettinger (center left, in white vestment) on the day of his episcopal consecration on February 24, 1942.

On December 6, 1941 Pius XII appointed Hettinger as the titular bishop of Teos and auxiliary bishop of Columbus. He was consecrated a bishop by Hartley on February 24, 1942 in St. Joseph Cathedral in Columba. The principal co-consecrators were Bishop Francis Howard of Covington and Auxiliary Bishop George Rehring of Cincinnati. Hettinger acted as apostolic administrator of the diocese following Hartley's death in 1944, as well as pastor of Sacred Heart Parish in Columbus.

=== Retirement and death ===
Hettinger's resignation as auxiliary bishop of Columbus was accepted by Pope Paul VI on October 14, 1977. He died in Columbus on December 28, 1996, at age 94. At the time of his death, he was the longest-serving bishop in the United States. Hettinger was buried in St. Mary Cemetery in Lancaster, following a funeral at Sacred Heart.
