= Hayden Building =

Hayden Building may refer to:

- Hayden Building (Boston)
- Hayden Building (Columbus, Ohio)
