= National Exchange Bank building =

Building in Columbus, Ohio

Coordinates: 39.960008°N 83.000473°W

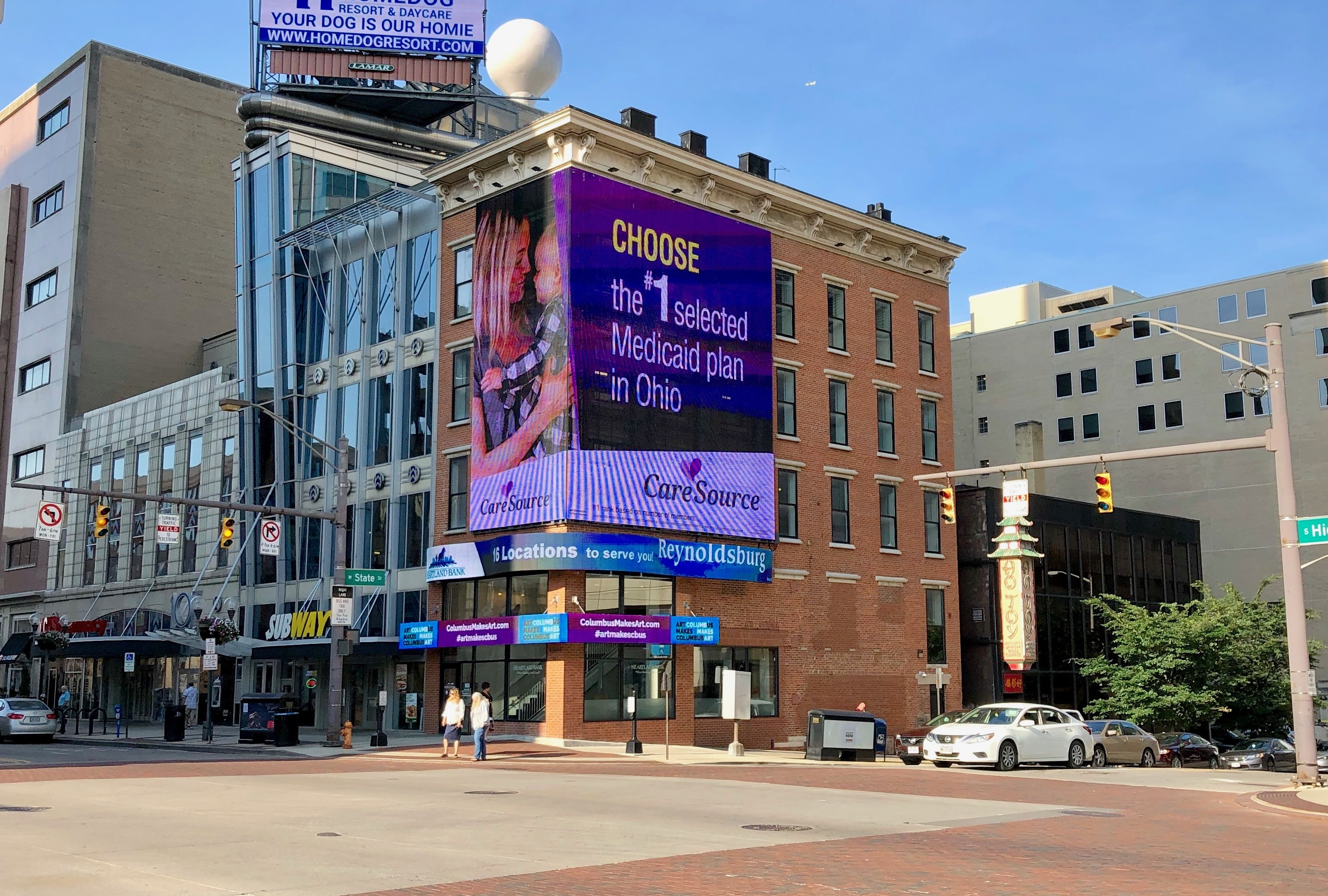
The building in 2019

The building, at right, c. 1909-1910

The National Exchange Bank building is a historic building on Capitol Square in Downtown Columbus, Ohio. The building, at 1 W. State St., was constructed in the 1860s as a bank, making it one of the oldest commercial buildings on Capitol Square. Today the building houses a branch of Heartland Bank.

The site was once known as the Clinton Bank Corner; the building there was constructed in 1830 by Samuel Barr, and was the first three-story building in the city. The structure was demolished in 1863 to be replaced with the National Exchange Bank building.

The original bank in the building, the National Exchange Bank of Columbus, was the second national bank organized in the city, established in December 1864. The bank was the only U.S. depository in the city. Its president was William G. Deshler. The bank was liquidated in 1892 and was absorbed by the Deshler National Bank, which was at the site of the Deshler Hotel.

The building was for many years the site of a Cord Camera store, and later sat vacant for about five years. In December 2012, a developer associated with the Schottenstein family purchased the 5,300-square-foot building for $465,000. Heartland Bank planned to open a branch there in September 2013. The building was planned to be renovated, including adding flashing LCD boards to make it a "gateway" to Columbus Commons and South High Street. These would include two 3-foot-tall ticker boards wrapping around the lower part of the building, and a larger board with a wrap-around video mesh covering much of the second-to-fourth floors. The large LCD was to display the bank's logo and promote the developer's projects.
