= John G. Deshler =

American financier and real estate developer (1852–1929)

John Green Deshler
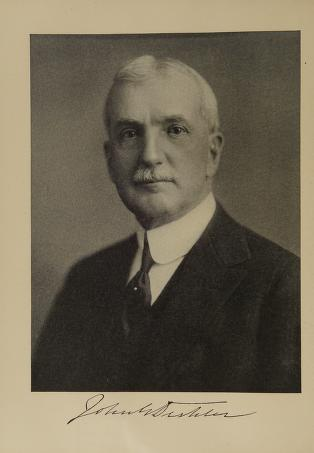
- Born: 9 December 1852; Columbus, Ohio
- Died: June 7 1929; Bexley, Ohio
- Education: Kenyon College
- Occupations: Financier; Real estate developer
- Spouse: Minnie Greene
- Children: Ann Eliza; Martha Greene
- Parent(s): William Greene; Ann Eliza (Sinks) Deshler

John Green Deshler (9 December 1852 – 7 June 1929) was an American financier and real estate developer.

== Biography ==
Deshler was born on December 9, 1852, in the Deshler residence on Broad Street in Columbus, Ohio and was the son of William Green and Ann Eliza (Sinks) Deshler. He attended public schools and Kenyon College, but left college in 1871 before graduating, to go to work as messenger in the Exchange National Bank. He was one of the organizers of the Deshler National Bank in 1879 and was its president when it was consolidated with the Hayden-Clinton Bank in 1910, also being made a director and member of the board of executives. Deshler was a director and key early investor in the Buckeye Steel Castings Company, with which he had been identified almost from its incorporation and in the development of which he had been active. He was president and the guiding force of the Central Ohio Natural Gas & Fuel Company, which found the gas in the Lancaster field and piped it to Columbus in 1890. In 1891 he built the Wyandotte Building, which was the first steel-frame skyscraper built in the city of Columbus, and which he sold in 1916 to the State of Ohio. As trustee of the Deshler estate he built the Deshler Hotel, for which his grandfather (David Deshler) acquired the land one hundred years prior for $1000, his father (William Green Deshler) acquired the money.

He married Minnie Greene, a daughter of M.M. Greene, the founder of Hocking Valley Railroad, and had two daughters – Ann Eliza and Martha Greene. He died on June 7, 1929, in Bexley.
