= James Joseph Hartley =

American Catholic bishop

His Excellency, The Most Reverend James Joseph Hartley
- Bishop of Columbus
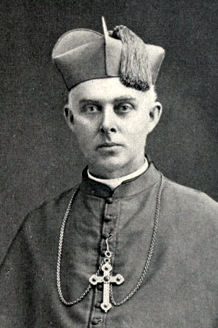
- Diocese: Diocese of Columbus
- Installed: March 1, 1904
- Term ended: January 12, 1944 (died)
- Predecessor: Henry K. Moeller
- Successor: Michael J. Ready

Orders
- Ordination: July 10, 1882 by John Ambrose Watterson
- Consecration: February 25, 1904 by Henry K. Moeller

Personal details
- Born: June 26, 1858 Davenport, Iowa, US
- Died: January 12, 1944 (aged 85) Columbus, Ohio, US
- Buried: St. Joseph Cemetery, Lockbourne, Ohio
- Denomination: Roman Catholic
- Parents: Edward Hartley and Catherine McManus Hartley
- Education: Athenaeum of Ohio; Our Lady of Angels Seminary
- Motto: Regina sacratissimi rosarii (Queen of the most holy rosary)

Styles of James J. Hartley
- Reference style: The Most Reverend
- Spoken style: Your Excellency
- Religious style: Monsignor
- Posthumous style: none

James Joseph Hartley (June 26, 1858 – January 12, 1944) was an American prelate of the Roman Catholic Church. He served as the fourth bishop of the Diocese of Columbus in Ohio from 1904 until his death in 1944. His was the longest episcopate in the diocese's history.

== Biography ==
=== Early life ===
The eldest of six children, James Hartley was born on June 26, 1858, in Davenport, Iowa, to Irish immigrants Edward Hartley and Catherine McManus Hartley. Shortly after his birth, Hartley and his family moved to Columbus, Ohio, where his parents had been married at St. Patrick Parish. His father kept a saloon on West Maple Street, and the family lived upstairs. His father also worked as a Columbus police officer for many years.

Hartley attended the parish school at St. Patrick, then entered St. Aloysius Seminary in Columbus. When that seminary closed, he attended Mount St. Mary's Seminary of the West in Norwood, Ohio, then Our Lady of Angels Seminary in Niagara, New York.

=== Priesthood ===
Hartley was ordained to the priesthood for the Diocese of Columbus by Bishop John A. Watterson on July 10, 1882, in St. Joseph Cathedral in Columbus. His first assignment was as assistant pastor at St. Peter's Parish in Steubenville, Ohio, then part of the diocese. In 1885, he was named pastor of Holy Name Parish in Steubenville. While pastor of Holy Name, Hartley organized a school, a high school, and built a new church. That church became the cathedral of the Diocese of Steubenville when the diocese was erected by Pope Pius XII on October 21, 1944.

=== Bishop of Columbus ===
On December 10, 1903, at the age of 45, Hartley was appointed as the fourth bishop of Columbus by Pope Pius X. He was consecrated by his predecessor Bishop Henry K. Moeller on February 25, 1904, at Holy Name Church in Steubenville. Bishops Denis O'Donaghue and Herman J. Alerding served as co-consecrators. Hartley was formally installed as bishop in St. Joseph Cathedral in Columbus, Ohio, on March 1, 1904.

During his tenure, Hartley oversaw a significant growth of the diocese. In 1905, he erected his first parishes, Holy Rosary and St. Aloysius. In 1906, he retired the debt on St. Joseph Cathedral. Within the first five years of his episcopate, Hartley had begun or dedicated more than 25 churches, schools, and chapels. He also renovated St. Joseph Cathedral.

Hartley establish the following institutions in Ohio:

- St. Charles Seminary in Columbus
- St. Joseph Cemetery in Lockbourne
- St. Ann Hospital in Westerville
- Mercy Hospital in Portsmouth
- Good Samaritan Hospital in Zanesville
- Mercy Hospital in Mount Vernon
- St. Therese Shrine in Columbus

Toward the end of his term as bishop, Hartley consecrated Reverend Edward Hettinger as the first auxiliary bishop of the diocese.

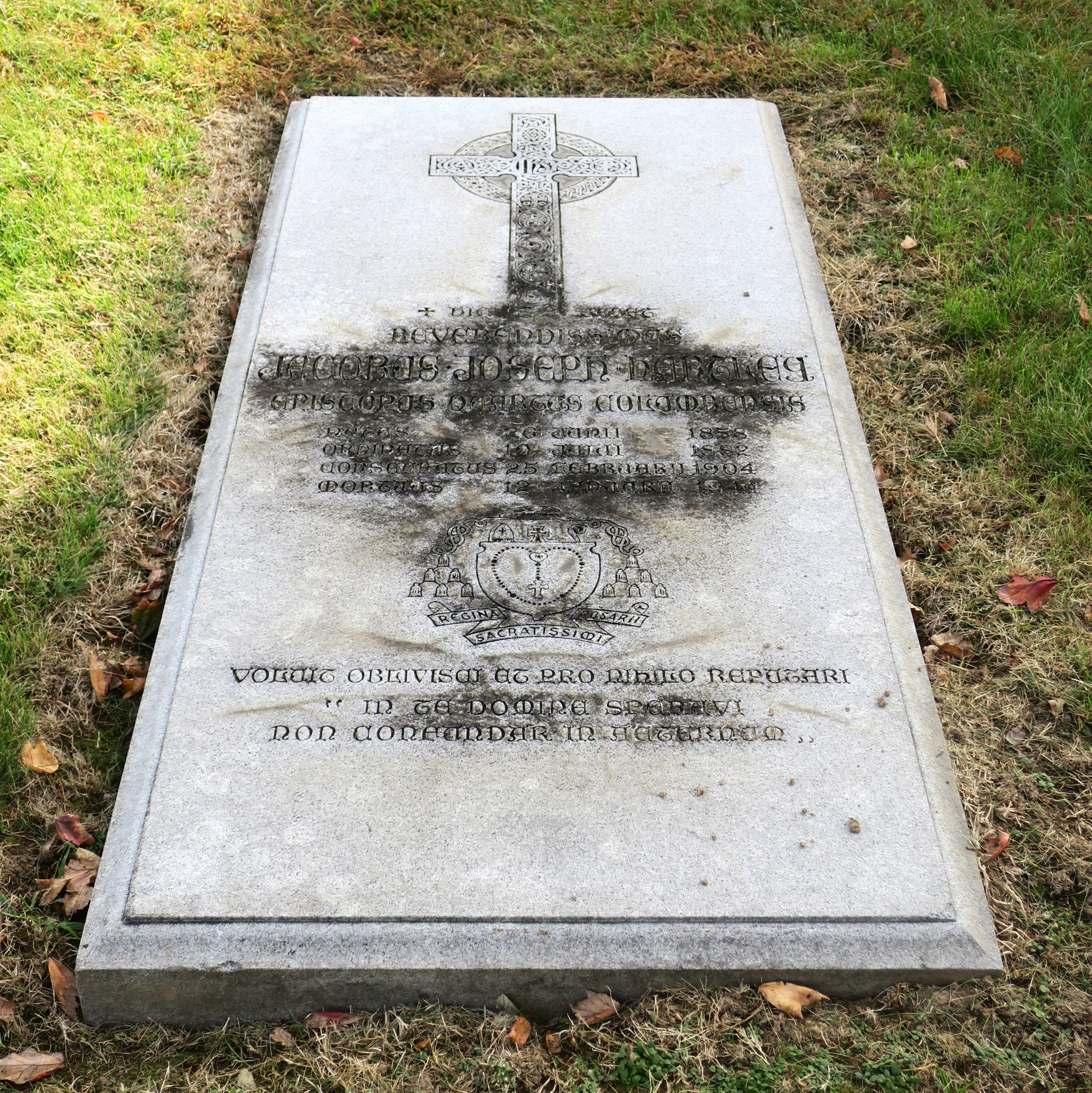
Bishop Hartley's grave, St. Joseph's Cemetery, Lockbourne, Ohio (2017)

=== Death and legacy ===
James Hartley died in Columbus on January 12, 1944, at age 85. He was buried at St. Joseph Cemetery in Lockbourne, Ohio. Bishop Hartley High School, founded in Columbus in 1957, is named in his honor.

== Footnotes ==
Catholic Church titles
Preceded by Henry K. Moeller	Bishop of Columbus; 1904–1944	Succeeded by Michael J. Ready
