= Benjamin Smith House (Columbus, Ohio) =

Historic house in Ohio, United States

- U.S. National Register of Historic Places
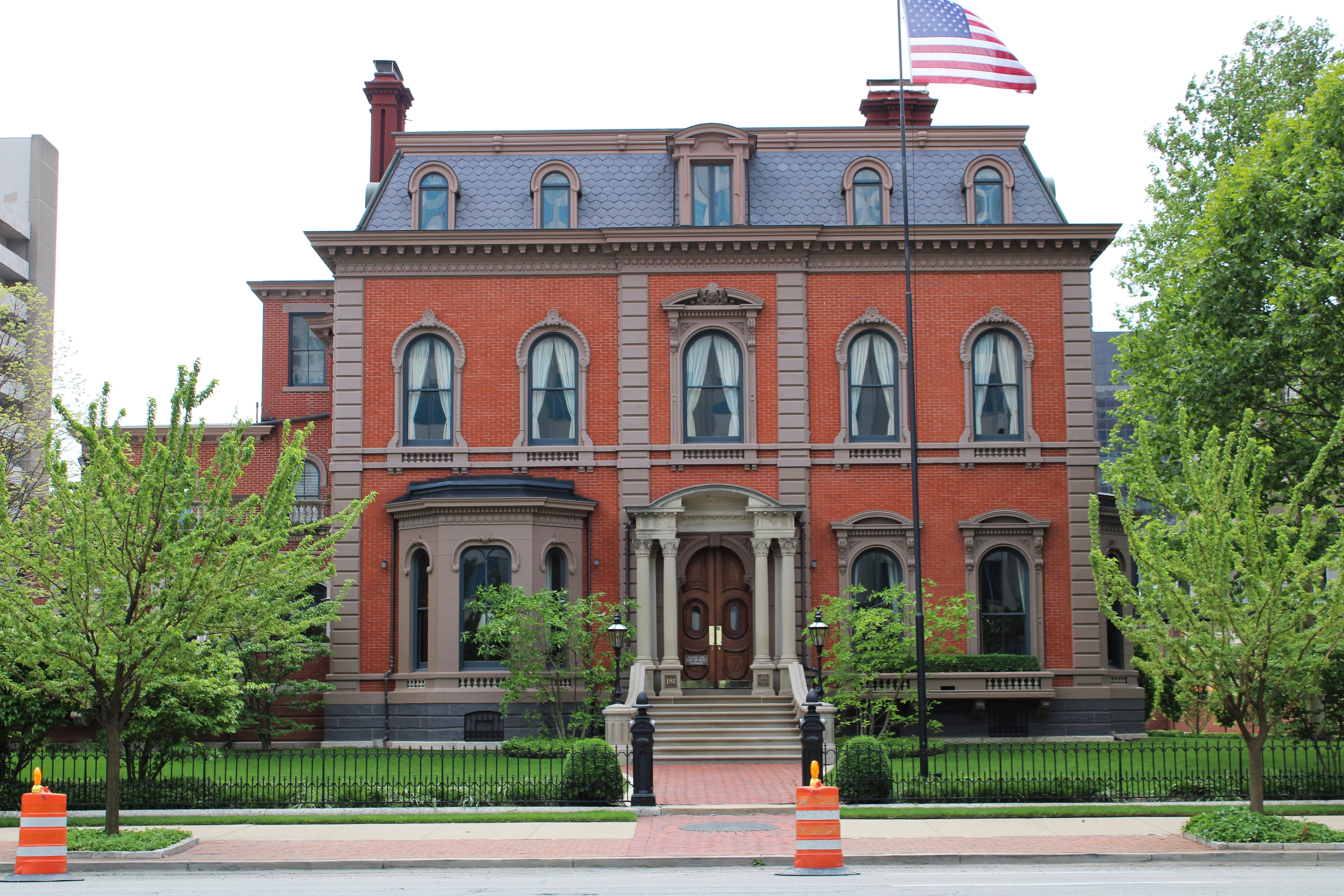
- Interactive map highlighting the building's location
- Location: 181 E. Broad St., Columbus, Ohio
- Coordinates: 39.962398°N 82.995788°W
- Built: c. 1860
- Architect: Nathan B. Kelley
- Architectural style: Second Empire style, Italianate
- NRHP reference No.: 73001438
- Added to NRHP: June 4, 1973

The Benjamin Smith House is a historic building in Downtown Columbus, Ohio. It was listed on the National Register of Historic Places in 1973. The house was built c. 1860 for Benjamin E. Smith, a wealthy financier. Smith lived in the house until 1883, when he moved to New York City. Rented by Ohio as a governor's mansion, it housed Ohio governors George Hoadly and Joseph Foraker. In 1886, the Columbus Club, a private club in the city, purchased the house and grounds, and are still housed there today.

The house was designed by Nathan B. Kelley, also one of the principal architects of the Ohio Statehouse.

== See also ==
- National Register of Historic Places listings in Columbus, Ohio
