= Nathan Kelley =

American architect (1808–1871)

Nathan B. Kelley
- Born: February 26, 1808; Union Township, Warren County, Ohio, US
- Died: November 19, 1871 (aged 63); Columbus, Ohio, US
- Occupation: Architect
- Buildings: Ohio Statehouse, Columbus, Ohio; Benjamin Smith House, Columbus, Ohio

Nathan B. Kelley (February 26, 1808 – November 20, 1871) was an American architect and builder. He was a prolific architect whose designs dominated the cityscape of Columbus, Ohio at the middle of the 19th century.

== Life and work ==
Little personal information exists about Kelley before he began a major commission in 1835 for the Columbus State Hospital, when he was 27 years of age. At about the same time, he was named as construction superintendent of the Ohio State School for the Blind. In the 1840s, city directories list him as surveyor and engineer for the city of Columbus.

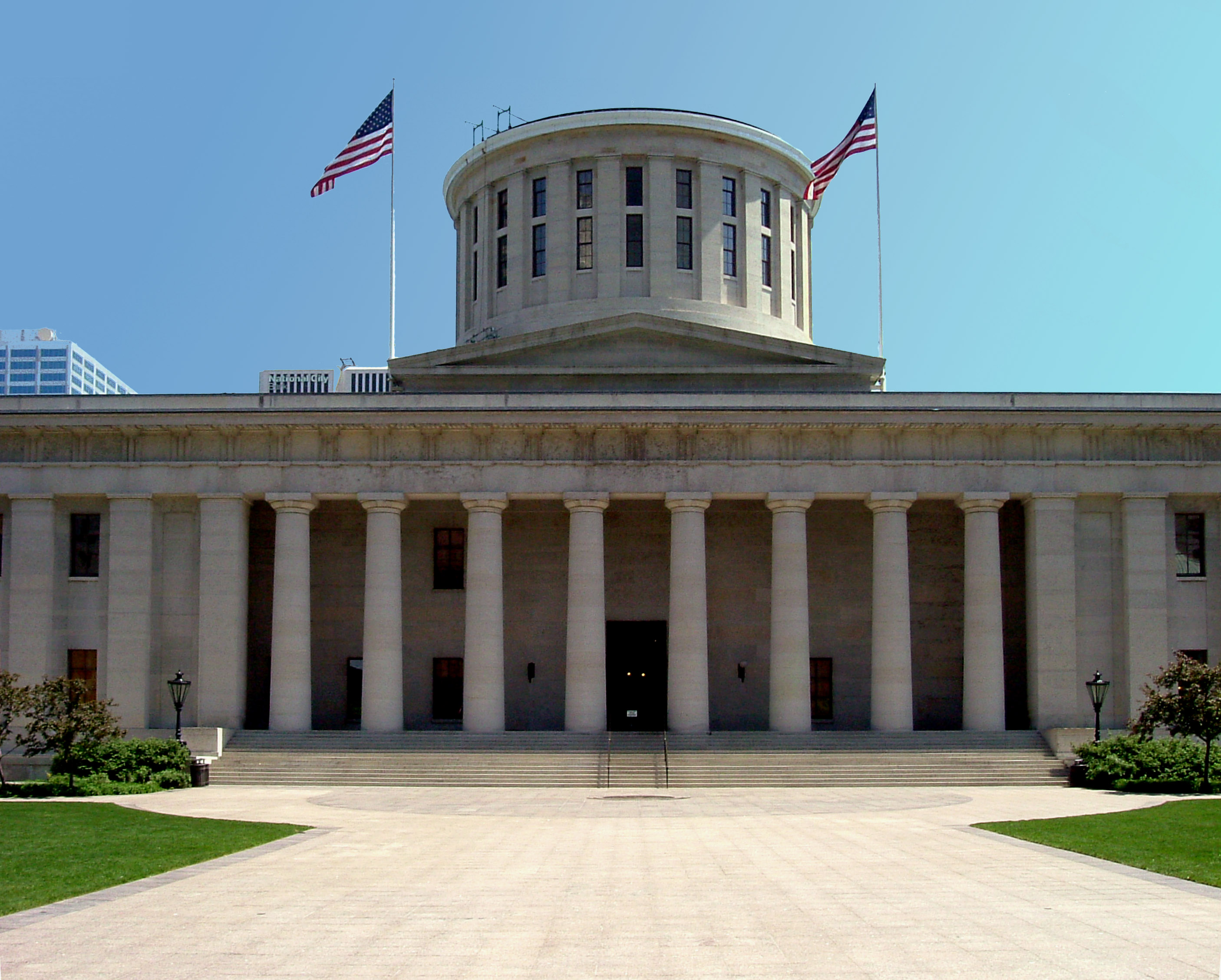
Ohio Statehouse

His most significant works are the interior space and mechanical systems of the Ohio Statehouse. This massive government building was erected between 1839 and 1861, with Kelley serving as one of four principal architects between 1854 and 1858. When he came to the project, Kelley basically began from scratch, as his predecessors had taken all plans and working drawings away with them. Walls and some flooring were in place, and first steps in erecting iron trusses for the roof had begun. Undaunted by the great scope of work before him, he saw it as fitting challenge for his abilities, stating the project was "a rare field for the exercise of ingenuity and invention in the correction of mistakes, careless conclusions and want of foresight." Seeing the building had no provision for heating or ventilation, Kelley designed an innovative steam heating system that was highly effective, at a time when central heating was a rare and expensive luxury. He was responsible for the finishing touches on the exterior of the building, as well as the design and engineering of most of the interior spaces.

I am Democratic in Architecture and believe in the free trade of ornament.

— Nathan B. Kelley

Kelley was forced off the project after repeated conflicts with the commission that oversaw the work for the state government. The major source of controversy arose from Kelley's florid and elegant plasterwork and high level of ornamentation, which reflects the use of Classical motifs combined with the decorative sensibilities of the Victorian era, and contrasted sharply with the restrained Greek Revival exterior of the structure. Kelley envisioned a highly decorated interior, in accord with the elegance and noble purpose of the building itself, and the stature of such a place in the developing state. He believed if the work were done in the "bare and bald" style, which the government commission overseeing the work favored, it would meet with little acceptance and have to soon be done over at great cost and effort. The chambers used by the House and Senate are basically as Kelley pictured them, though with some modern additions and alteration of layout, but with decorative scheme intact. They give some indication of what he would have done as far as finishes in the central rotunda, which he planned to be the most ornate and opulent space in the building. He made further recommendations that monumental paintings or murals be installed in the rotunda (the panels intended for this purpose were never hung with art as he wished), and hoped that the government "would see fit to honor the nation's great general" (George Washington) with a statue in the rotunda, which also never came to pass.

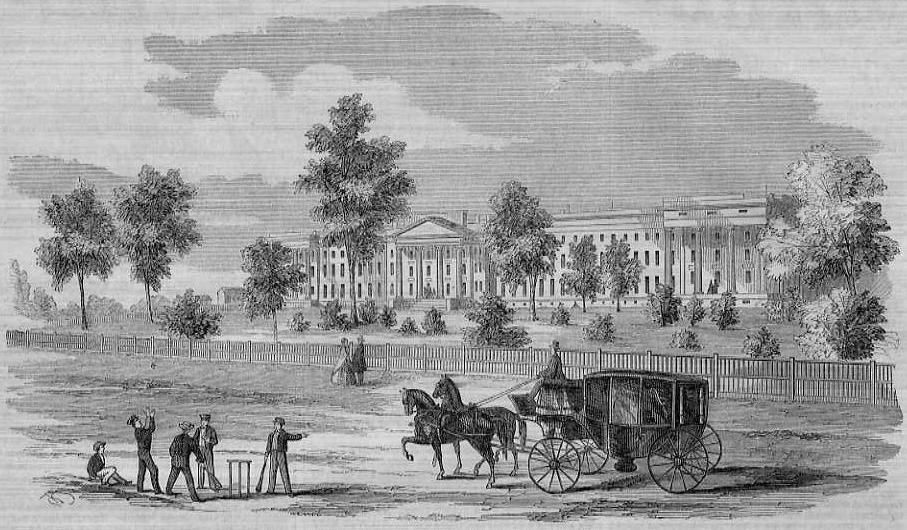
Columbus State Hospital, Columbus, Ohio, opened in 1838

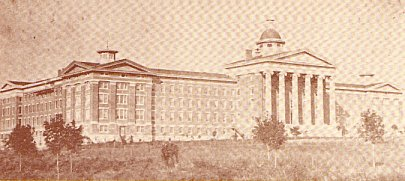
Western State Hospital, Hopkinsville, Kentucky, still used as a care facility. Kelley was involved in the original construction and in its rebuilding after an 1860s fire.

In Columbus, in addition to the psychiatric hospital, blind school and Ohio Statehouse. Kelley was responsible for the 1840 Franklin County Courthouse, many schools and churches, commercial buildings, and a variety of private residences. His residence for Benjamin E. Smith, one of his last active commissions, was completed in 1871, and is still in use as a home for the Columbus Club. Another surviving building is the Hayden Block, a yellow sandstone building on Broad Street directly to the north of the statehouse. Originally a bank and office building, it still is used for those purposes. A powerhouse for the city of Columbus, begun soon before his death and completed by his son James, was located near the Scioto River, on land that is still used by the city for a utility complex. He also designed the city's first Central High School in 1860.

Immediately after his dismissal from the Ohio Statehouse project, he left the Columbus area and worked in southwest Ohio and in Kentucky. In the western Kentucky city of Hopkinsville, Kelley made a significant contribution to the built landscape. His projects in the city overlap his tenure on the Ohio Statehouse, beginning with the woman's school Bethel College, completed in 1855. He also erected a home for the Leavell family and a second all-female institution of higher learning, South Kentucky College (1858). He also built a second mental institution, which still stands and houses patients, the Western State Hospital.

In his long career, Kelley combined a tenacious ability to champion his own personal artistic choices with a willingness to recognize changes in popular taste and fashion. In his obituary in the Columbus Statesman newspaper, his work was called "of the substantial kind, with a most desirable absence of that confusion of styles which condemns so many expensive buildings."

Many of Kelley's buildings in Columbus and other locations did not survive, as growth and development overtook them. His life and career are an example of how someone well regarded and respected in his own time can come to be almost anonymous a century after his death.

=== Death ===
No image of the man himself exists and his grave in Green Lawn Cemetery was unmarked until 2012, when a preservation group funded a stone monument fashioned from Columbus limestone, the material used for the Ohio Statehouse.

== Personal life ==
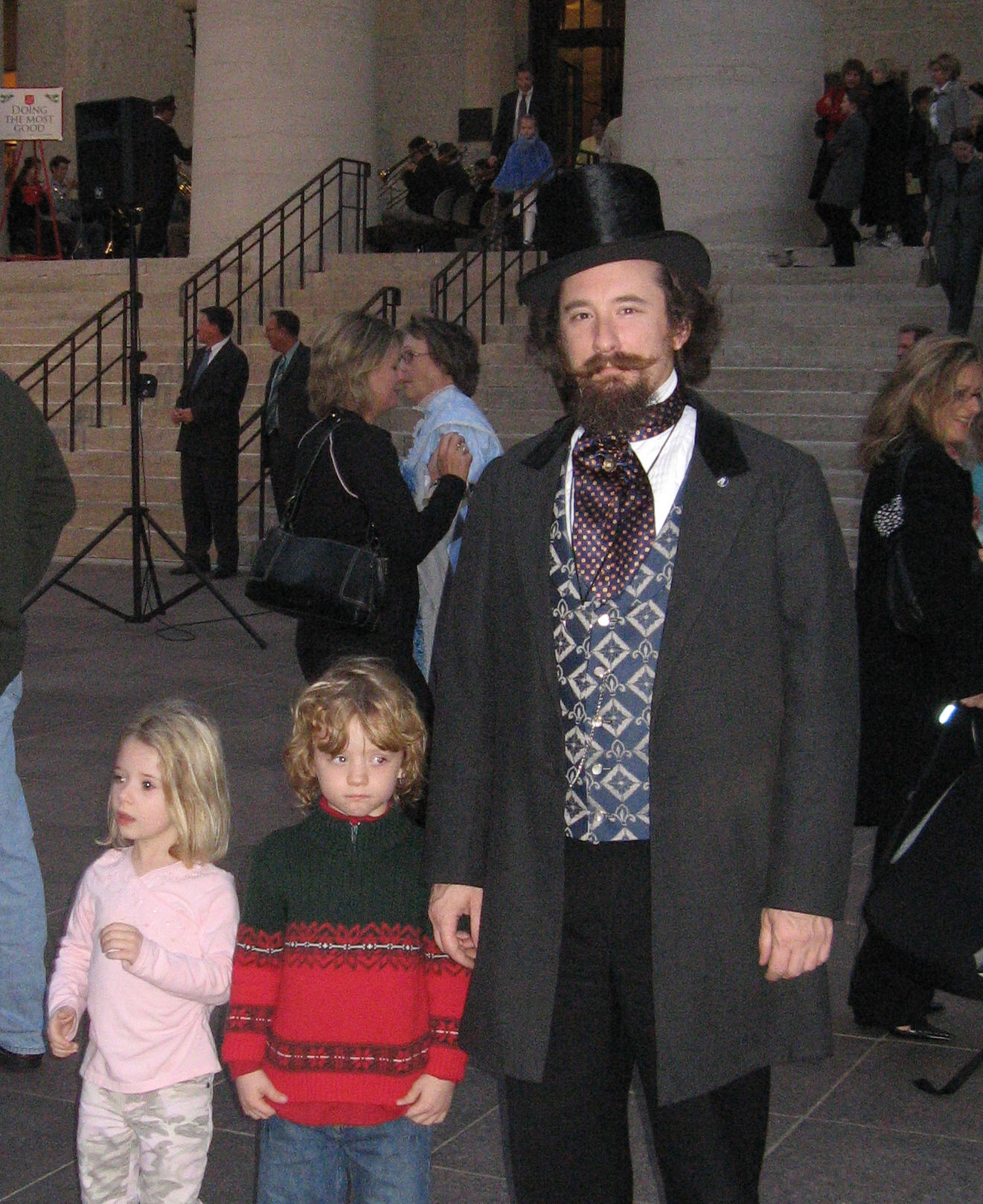
An historical interpreter in character as Nathan B. Kelley accompanies two children during a public event on the grounds of the Ohio Statehouse. The columns in view at the background are part of the west face of the building, fronting on High Street.

Kelley married the former Malinda Hufford in 1832, shortly before they moved to Columbus. The Hufford family was of Swiss extraction, having originally settled in Virginia before coming to Ohio in 1831. Kelley is listed as head of household in the 1840, 1850 and 1870 U.S. censuses as residing in Columbus, and he and his family are enumerated three times in 1860 :in Columbus, the 6th ward of Cincinnati and in Hopkinsville, Christian County, Kentucky. Census records, burial records and city directories make it possible to state that Kelley had two sons, William George (1843–1867) and James H (1847–1876). He had at least one daughter, perhaps two, but records are contradictory. Martha Jane Kelley (1835–1836) is buried in Green Lawn beside her father and brothers. A Maria Kelley, aged 3, is part of the 1850 census listing, but appears in no other census listings, and is not mentioned in probate records when Kelley died.

James H. Kelley is listed in city directories as clerk to his father, or architect in his own right. The very real possibility that there are no direct descendants of Nathan B. Kelley is evidenced by the fact that his wife is mentioned as having resided with her brother Daniel Hufford for six years in his obituary dated 1891. It is unlikely that Malinda Kelley would have had to rely upon the charity of her brother if any of her own children had been able to provide for her. This is confirmed by the fact that probate records for the estate of Nathan Kelley indicate he died intestate, Malinda Kelley requested not to serve as executor, and James H. Kelley requested that duty as the only child and heir. Malinda Hufford Kelley died in 1893.

Kelley was a member of the Independent Order of Odd Fellows (IOOF), a fraternal organization devoted to the welfare and betterment of its members and society at large. He was a founder of the first IOOF lodge in Columbus, the group for most of its life meeting in a building at the corner of High and State Streets that also contained a bank and Kelley's offices.

== Family name and history ==
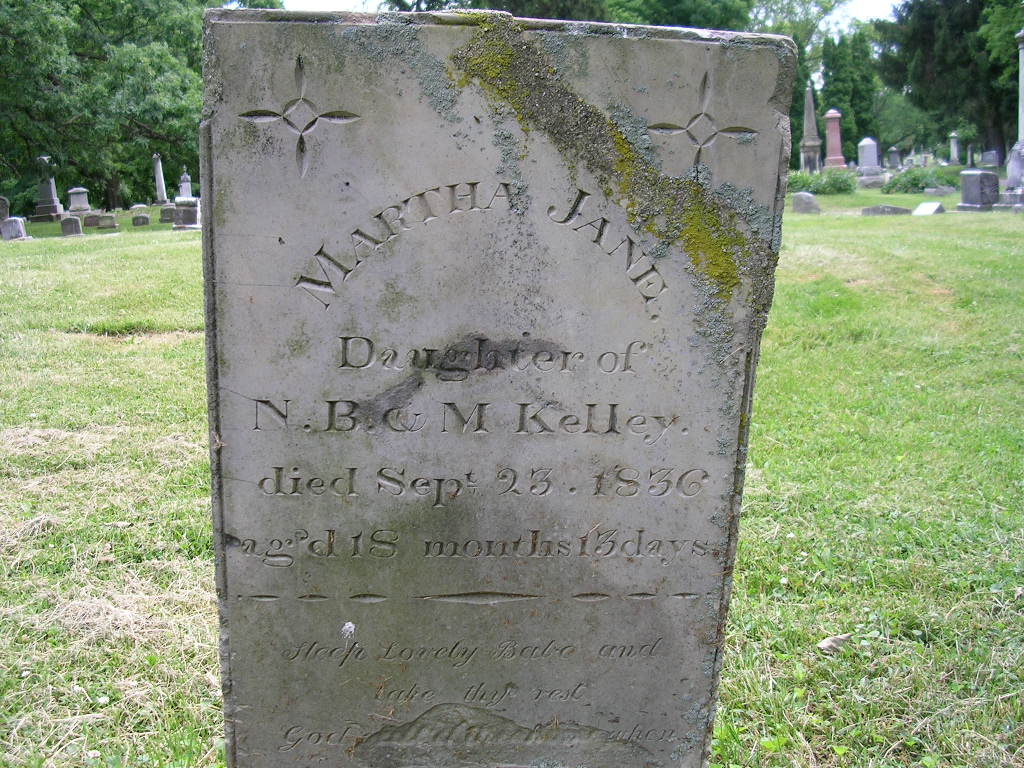
Grave marker of Nathan B. Kelley's first-born child, Martha Jane, who is buried in Green Lawn Cemetery. She was originally interred in Columbus' North Burying Ground, the site of the current North Market in Columbus. Kelley's grave is beside hers, but was unmarked. Kelley's sons James and William are also buried alongside their sister.

As is typical of the time period, there was little consistency in the spelling of personal names. In various sources, it is spelled either Kelley or Kelly. Burial records from Green Lawn Cemetery and his daughter's tombstone there, as well as his grandfather's biography from an early history of Warren County have it as Kelley, while his obituary in a Columbus newspaper and his own signature on working drawings omit the final ‘e’ and spell the name Kelly. In some sources he is also known as N.B. Kelley.

Kelley was of Anglo-Irish heritage, his great-grandfather John Kelley leaving Belfast, Ireland to settle in New Castle, Delaware. The architect was named for his paternal grandfather, Nathan Kelley (1760–1845), who left Delaware to head west, first to south western Pennsylvania, where he married Hannah Miller, and then to Warren County in what was then the Northwest Territory. The elder Nathan was a prosperous farmer who served the area as justice of the peace, appeals court judge and state representative. Nathan B. Kelley was the third of 8 children born to James Miller Kelley and Rebecca Ludlum Kelley. The Ludlum line can be traced back to Derbyshire, England. The Kelley family had a demonstrated habit of sharing names among generations and branches of the family, so that Nathan had both uncles and brothers with the same names. He had a nephew, Nathan Kelley Hufford, named in his honor. His elder brothers Thomas Jefferson Kelley and George Washington Kelley demonstrate the patriotic zeal felt in the still young nation.

Kelley's younger brother James Finley Kelley (1816–1894) was also a resident of Columbus, Ohio, where with his wife, the former Eliza Van Horn, he raised three children: Albert (b. 1845), a railroad brakeman, Virginia (b. 1857), a school teacher, and Rebecca (b. 1859). Census records list James? F. Kelley as a pattern maker and metal foundry supervisor, so it is likely he was involved in the statehouse project in some capacity.

== See also ==
- Architecture of Columbus, Ohio
