= St. Joseph Cathedral (Columbus, Ohio) =

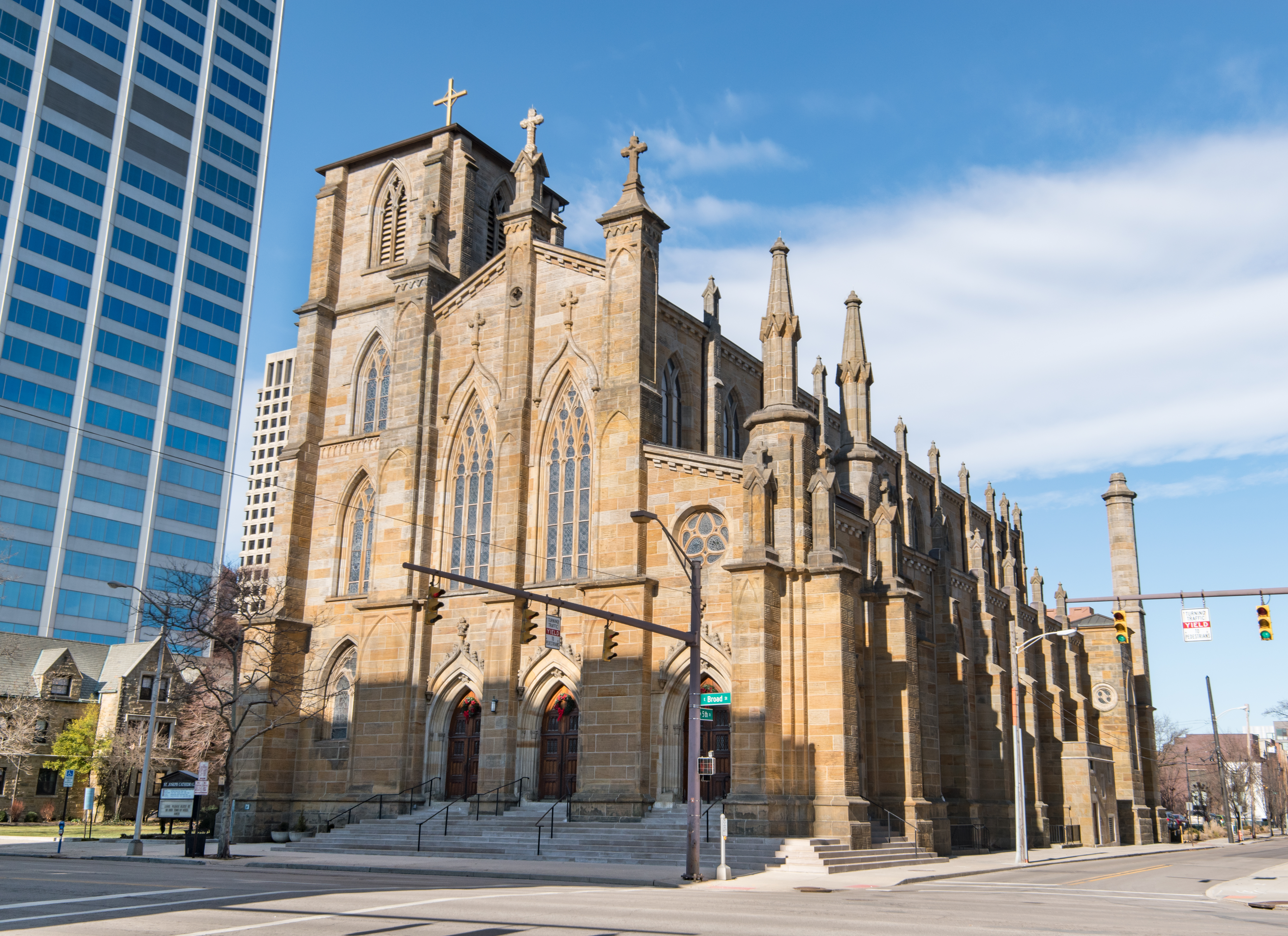
- St. Joseph Cathedral
- 39°57′48″N 82°59′41″W
- Location: 212 E. Broad St., Columbus, Ohio
- Country: United States
- Denomination: Catholic Church
- Website: sjchcc.org//

History
- Founded: 1866

Architecture
- Architect(s): Michael Harding; Robert T. Brookes
- Style: Gothic Revival
- Completed: 1878

Specifications
- Capacity: 700
- Length: 185 ft (56 m)
- Width: 92 ft (28 m)
- Materials: Ashlar

Administration
- Diocese: Diocese of Columbus

Clergy
- Bishop: Earl K. Fernandes
- Rector: Jan Sullivan

Columbus Register of Historic Properties
- Designated: June 14, 1982
- Reference no.: CR-7

St. Joseph Cathedral is a Catholic cathedral located in Columbus, Ohio in the United States that serves as the seat of the Diocese of Columbus. The church building, completed in 1878, is located on Broad Street in Downtown Columbus.

== History ==
=== St. Joseph Church ===
During the 1860s, St. Joseph Parish in Columbus served Irish Catholic immigrants to that city; it was under the jurisdiction of the Archdiocese of Cincinnati. Its pastor, Edward M. Fitzgerald, soon realized that the city needed another parish to relieve overcrowding at St. Patrick. After receiving $37,000 in donations from 250 people, Fitzgerald was able in 1866 to purchase a property for the new church on Broad Street in Columbus for $13,500.. The male parishioners of St. Patrick voted to name the new parish St. Joseph.

Construction of St. Joseph Church began on June 6, 1866. Auxiliary Bishop Sylvester H. Rosecrans of Cincinnati laid the cornerstone of St. Joseph on November 11, 1866.In 1867, the Vatican appointed Fitzgerald as bishop of the Diocese of Little Rock. Rosecrans succeeded him as pastor of St. Patrick's.

=== St. Joseph Cathedral ===
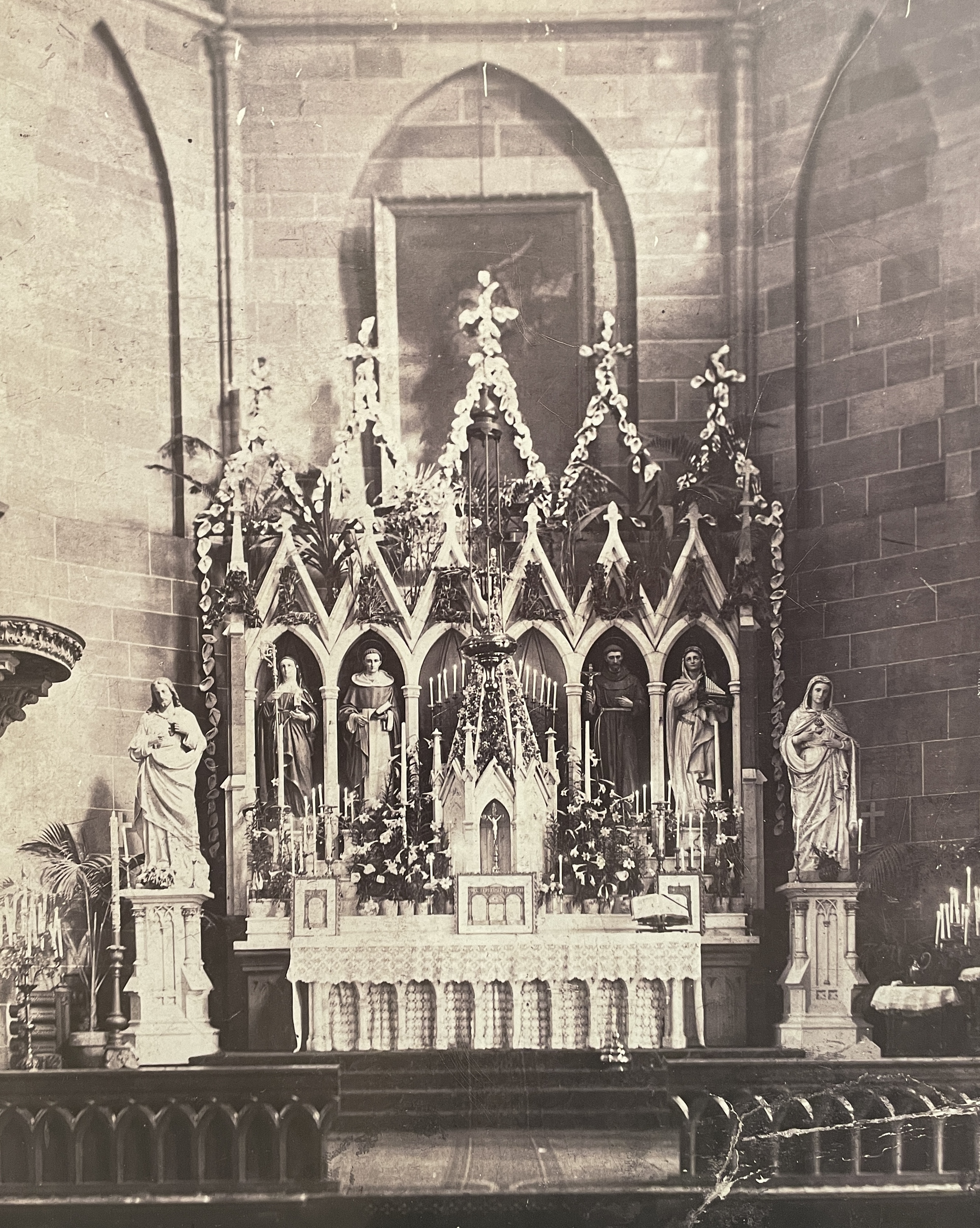
Interior, St. Joseph Cathedral (circa 1878)

==== 1868 to 1872 ====
On March 3, 1868, Pope Pius IX erected the Diocese of Columbus and named Rosecrans as its first bishop. St. Joseph Church, still in the early stages of construction, was now designated as St. Joseph Cathedral.

Construction was halted while the diocese redrew the plans for the new building. Instead of being a brick building, it was now planned as stone building, with the architect modifying the foundation plans.The new plans also called for a bell tower with three clock faces and chimes. Retired General William Rosecrans of the Union Army, older brother of Sylvester Rosecrans, came to Columbus to assist him with the design plans in 1870.

==== 1872 to 1887 ====
Rosecrans celebrated the first Mass in the unfinished St. Joseph's on December 25, 1872. Cardinal John McCloskey of the Archdiocese of New York donated the marble for the creation of the main altar and side altars. In 1873, the parish purchased the home of Joseph Gundersheimer on Broad Street to serve as a temporary rectory.In February 1873, John Mangan and Annie Clifford became the first couple to be married in the cathedral. Although the interior decoration was incomplete, Rosecrans consecrated St. Joseph's Cathedral on October 20, 1878. He died the following day and was interred beneath the main altar. The final project cost was $218,000.

==== 1887 to 1949 ====
St. Joseph Cathedral (1900-1910)

In 1887, Bishop John Ambrose Watterson purchased the former home of financier William G. Deshler for use as a rectory for the cathedral clergy.The diocese in 1907 purchased the Kelley Mansion on Broad Street to serve as the St. Joseph Cathedral school.

Bishop James Hartley oversaw the addition of a copper roof on St. Joseph's in addition to new pews, sanctuary furniture, and pillars in 1913, at a cost of around $100,000. A group of iron support pillars was also removed, the altar replaced, and a marble railing installed in place of the wooden one.In 1923, the diocese purchased a new pipe organ for the cathedral from the Ernest M. Skinner & Company of Boston, Massachusetts.

==== 1949 to 1992 ====
In 1949, Bishop Michael Ready remodeled the sanctuary at St. Joseph's. He installed the present baldachin, along with a new altar of botticino marble with onyx pillars. The renovation also added a Blessed Sacrament Chapel, a Marian Chapel, and the Terce Chapel dedicated to St. Joseph. The renovations were completed in 1953. Ready also razed the old rectory, replacing with the bishop's residence and the diocesan chancery.

Bishop John Carberry re-positioned the altar at St. Joseph's to allow for versus populum celebration of the Mass in 1965. Two years later, the diocese excavated the undercroft to create a parish hall with a kitchen, meeting rooms, and a bookstore. More extensive remodeling of the sanctuary began in 1978.

==== 1992 to present ====
In 1992, the diocese cleaned and restored the sandstone exterior of St. Joseph's. In 2000, the baldacchino and Marian shrine were restored and replated. Polish artist Grzegorz Kucharski painted the depictions of the Holy Family that were hung in the apse in 2002, the same year the current organ was installed.

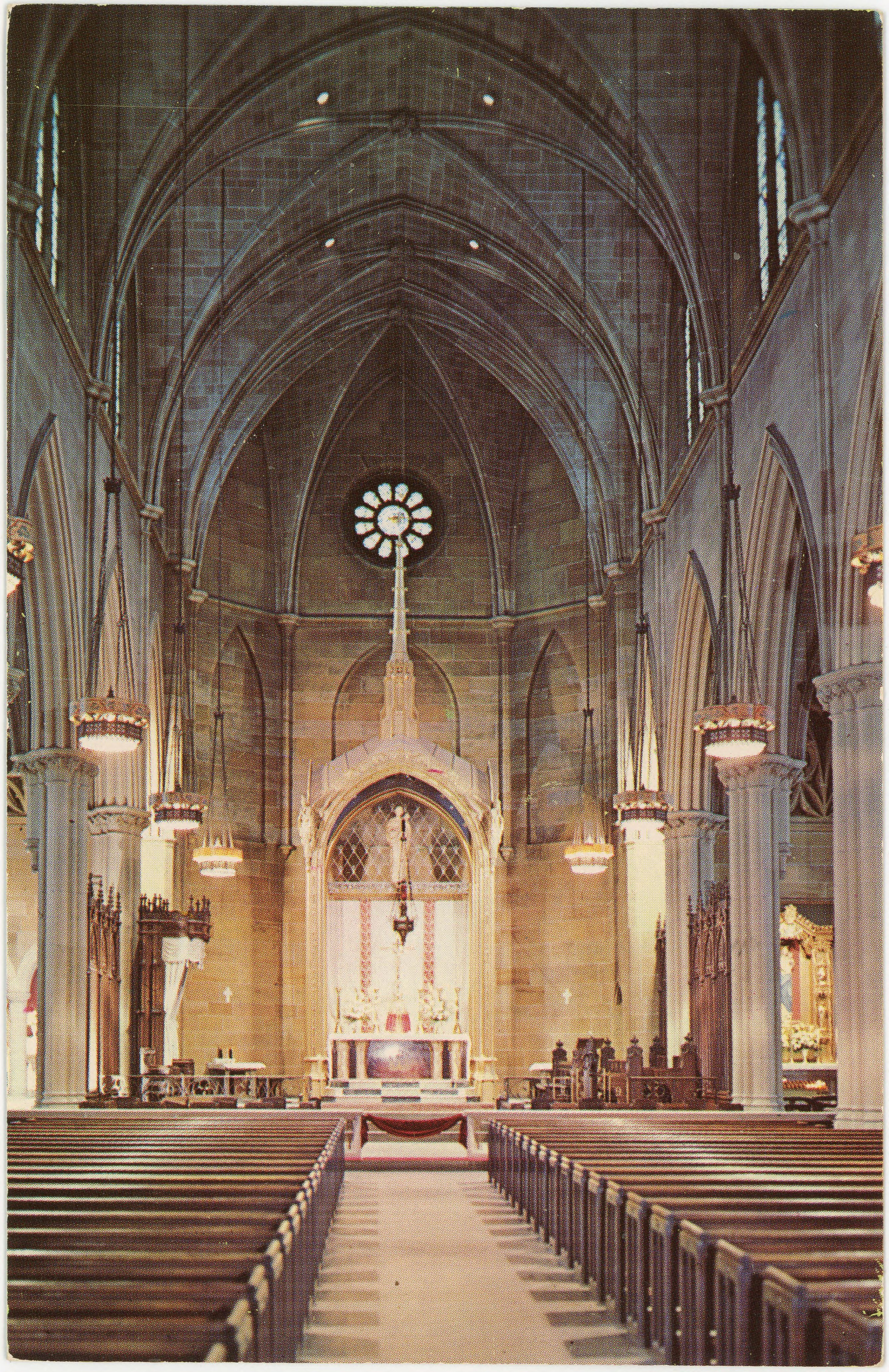
Interior, St. Joseph Cathedral (pre 1978)

Bishop Robert J. Brennan was celebrating a Respect Life Mass at St. Joseph's in 2021 when eight protesters temporarily disrupted it. Brennan later issued a statement, thanking law enforcement, cathedral staff, and worshippers, saying they reflect "joy, hope, and mercy that [mark] our pro-life witness."

In 2023, the diocese merged Holy Cross Parish with St. Joseph Cathedral Parish, leaving Holy Cross Church open as a worship site.For the 2023 Christmas season, the historic State Automobile Mutual Insurance Company nativity scene was installed on the cathedral lawn.

== St. Joseph Cathedral School ==
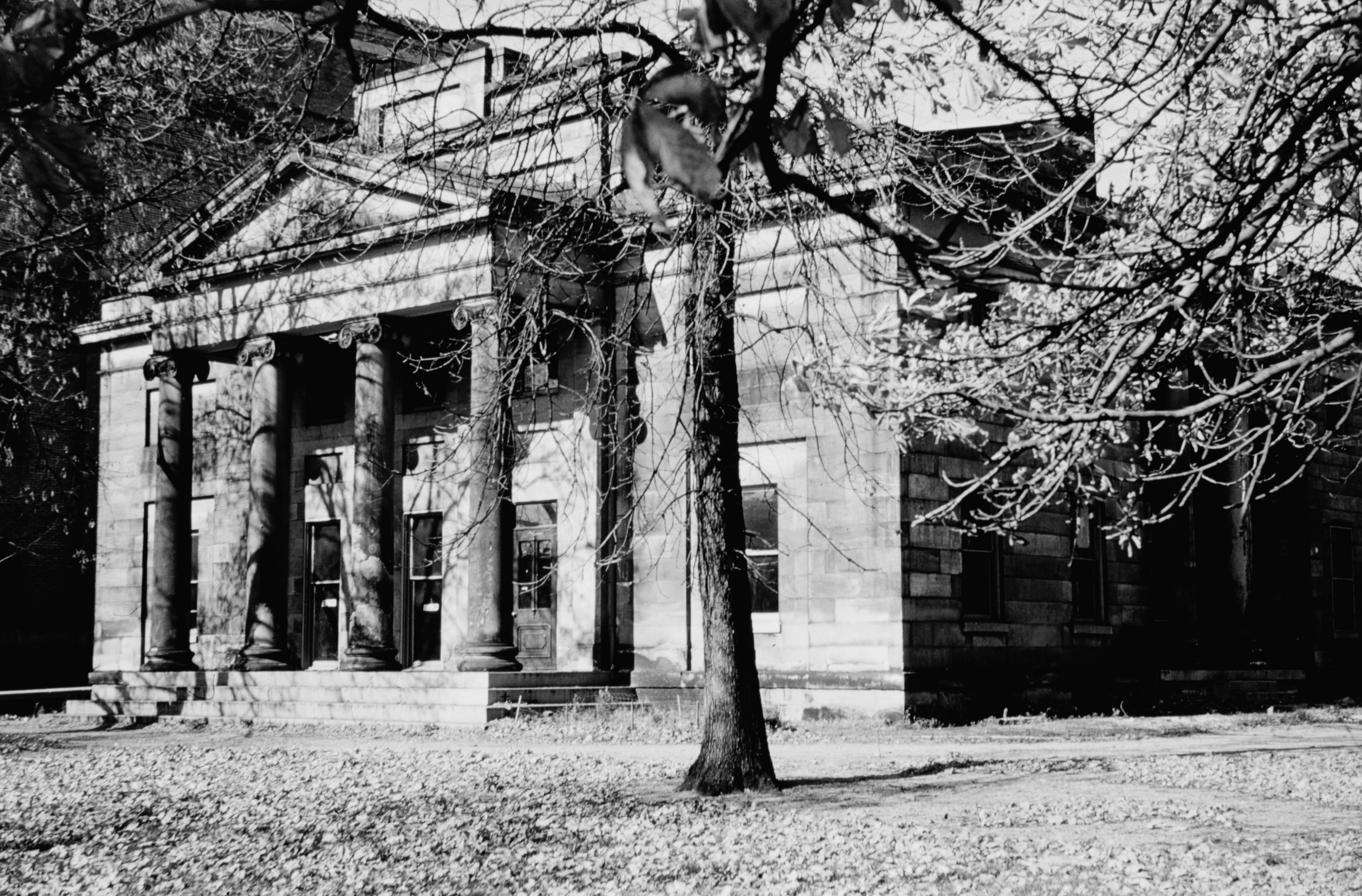
The Kelley house, built in 1839, housed the Cathedral School from 1907 to 1968.

The St. Joseph parishioners in 1907 acquired the Alfred Kelley mansion, remodeling it into the St. Joseph Cathedral Schools. The modified building had 12 classrooms. Members of the Sisters of Notre Dame de Namur taught in the school.

School enrollment never reached a sustainable level for the parish. In 1941, the parish opened a Latin school to prepare boys for entry into the Saint Charles Seminary in Columbus. However, the Latin school closed three years later. In 1958, Bishop Clarence Issenmann announced the consolidation of the St. Joseph Cathedral school into the Holy Cross School. The former school site is now a parking lot.

== Cathedral architecture ==
St. Joseph Cathedral was designed in the Gothic Revival style and built of ashlar stone quarried in Licking and Fairfield counties. The exterior dimensions of the building are 185 by 92 feet (56 m × 28 m) with walls 3 feet (0.91 m) thick.

The Broad Street (south) façade of the cathedral houses three entrances and is flanked by two towers. The southwest tower is 312 feet (95 m) high and contains three clock faces and a chime of ten bells. The southeast tower is 200 feet (61 m) tall.

Gallery of cathedral images

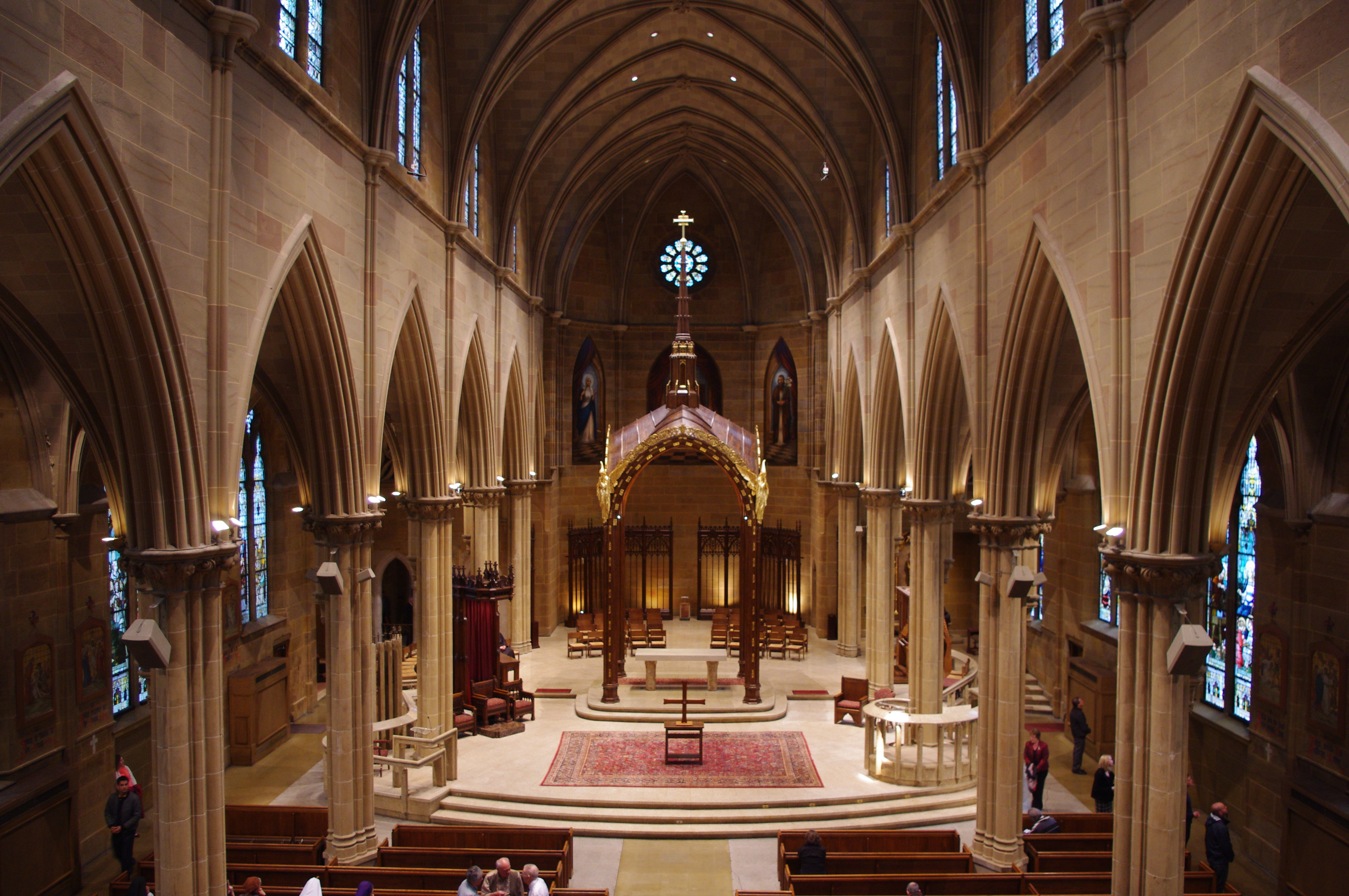
Interior (2011)

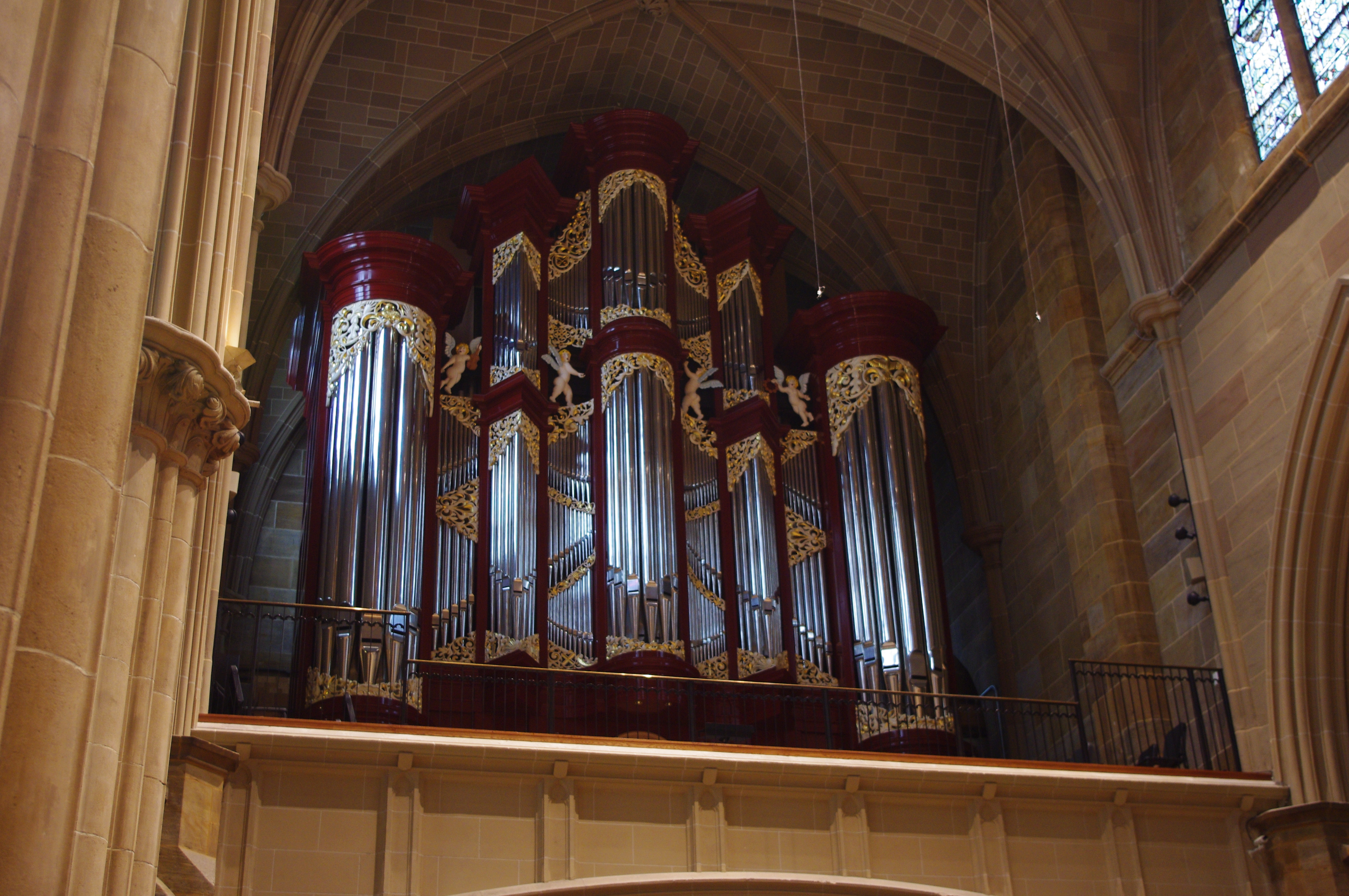
Pipe organ (2011)

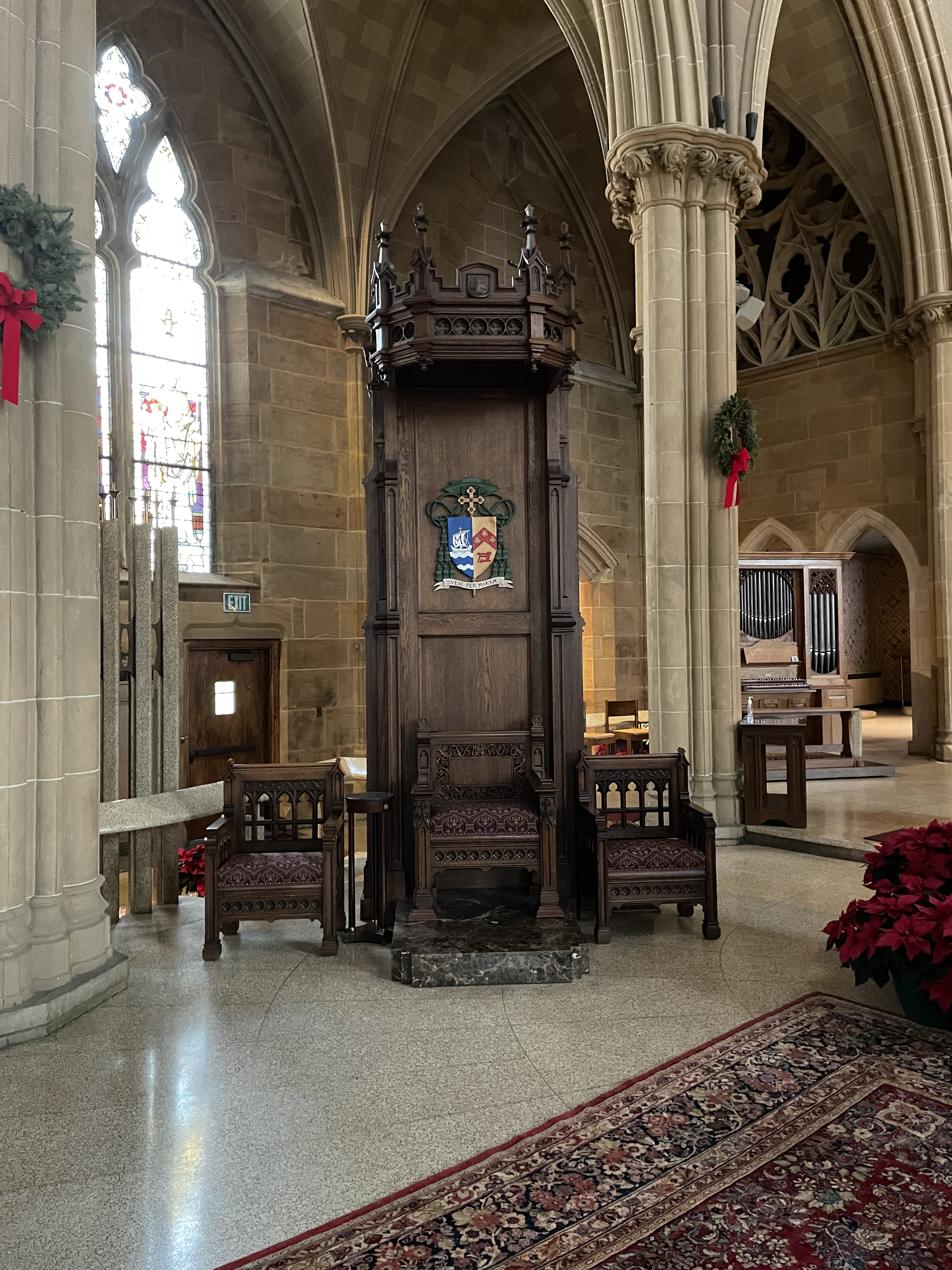
Cathedra (2022)

== See also ==
- List of cathedrals in the United States
- List of Catholic cathedrals in the United States
