= Michael Joseph Ready =

His Excellency, The Most Reverend Michael Joseph Ready
- Bishop of Columbus
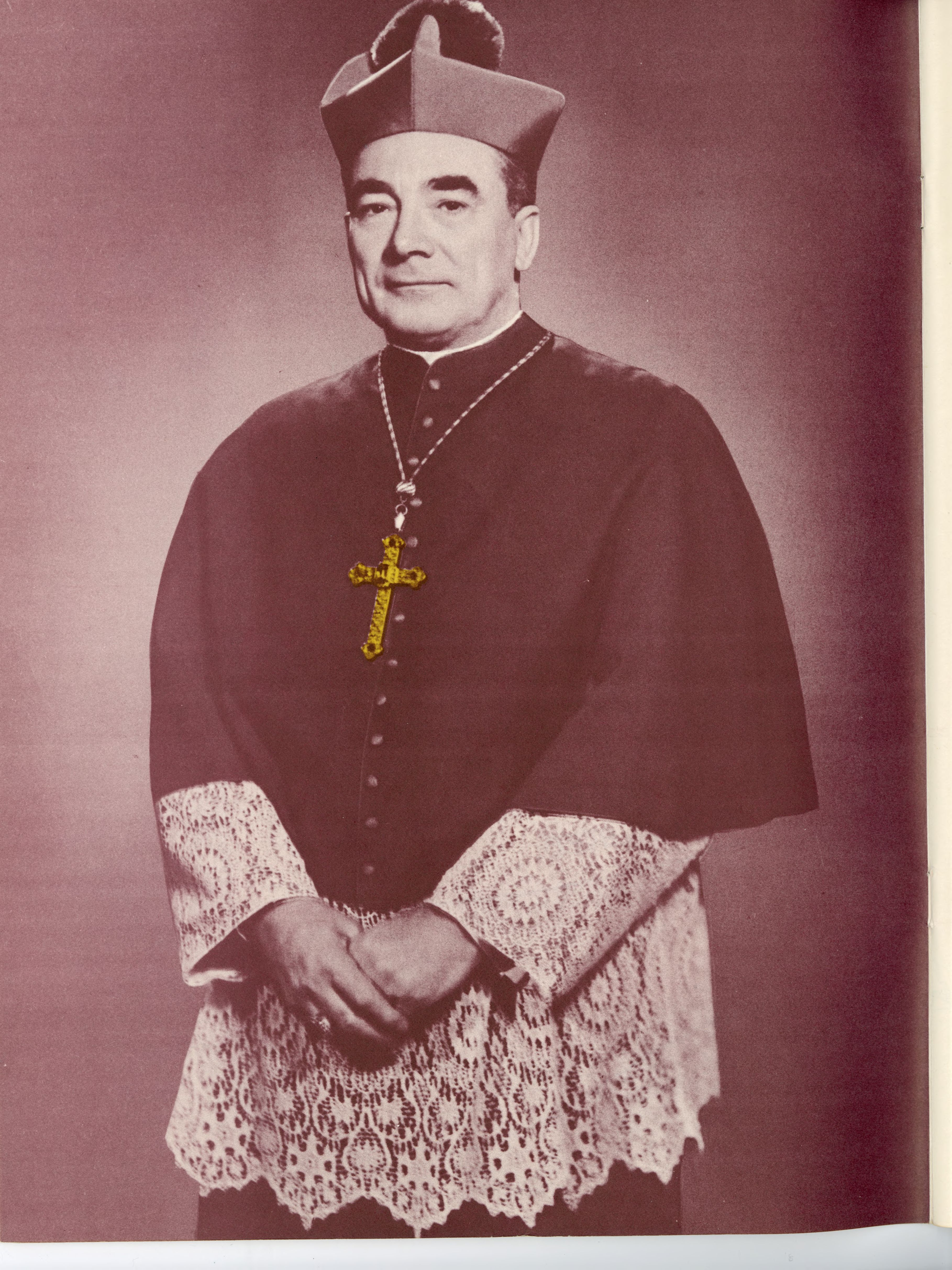
- Bishop Ready in 1953
- Church: Roman Catholic Church
- See: Diocese of Columbus
- In office: January 4, 1945 to May 2, 1957
- Predecessor: James Joseph Hartley
- Successor: Clarence George Issenmann

Orders
- Ordination: September 14, 1918 by John Farrelly
- Consecration: December 14, 1944 by Archbishop Amleto Cicognani

Personal details
- Born: April 9, 1893 New Haven, Connecticut, US
- Died: May 2, 1957 (aged 64) Columbus, Ohio, US
- Education: St. Vincent Seminary; St. Bernard Seminary; St. Mary Seminary
- Motto: Quae sunt Dei Deo (What are God's things to God)

Styles of Michael Ready
- Reference style: The Most Reverend
- Spoken style: Your Excellency
- Religious style: Monsignor
- Posthumous style: none

Michael Joseph Ready (April 9, 1893 – May 2, 1957) was an American prelate of the Catholic Church. He served as bishop of the Diocese of Columbus in Ohio from 1944 until his death.

== Biography ==
=== Early life ===
The second youngest of 14 children, Michael Ready was born on April 9, 1893, in New Haven, Connecticut, to Michael T. and Mary A. (née Ellis) Ready. His parents were Irish immigrants who immigrated to the United States in the 1880s. In 1900, the Ready family relocated from Connecticut to Mansfield, Ohio, and later to Barberton, Ohio.

Ready studied at St. Vincent Seminary in Latrobe, Pennsylvania, at St. Bernard Seminary in Rochester, New York, and at St. Mary Seminary in Cleveland, Ohio.

=== Priesthood ===
Ready was ordained to the priesthood in Cleveland for the Diocese of Cleveland by Bishop John Farrelly on September 14, 1918. He then served as an assistant pastor, teacher, and director of the Society for the Propagation of the Faith in the diocese. In 1931, he was named assistant general secretary of the National Catholic Welfare Conference, becoming its general secretary in 1936. The Vatican elevated Ready to the rank of monsignor in 1934. During his time in Washington, Ready became friends with sports writer Bob Considine, baptizing his son in 1939.

In 1939, Ready joined Bishops John Gannon and James Griffin in a visit to Mexico to confer with Archbishop Luis Martínez. They were discussing the founding of a seminary in Las Vegas, New Mexico, to supply priests for the Mexican Church, since seminaries were at that time illegal in that country. During the Spanish Civil War in the late 1930s, Ready denounced the Spanish government for its anti-clerical policies. In 1940, Ready expressed his opposition to military conscription in the United States, favoring volunteer recruiting

Ready delivered the benediction at the 1941 inauguration in Washington of US President Franklin D. Roosevelt. Later that year, he met with Roosevelt after the latter made controversial remarks regarding the status of religious freedom in the Soviet Union.

In 1942, after the American entry into World War II in December 1941, Ready declared that "the liberty and institutions" of the United States were threatened by the same "rampant totalitarian military forces which harass the Church and all that the Church has built," in an implicit reference to the Japanese Empire. In 1944, Reverend Stanislaus Orlemanski visited the Soviet Union to meet Premier Joseph Stalin, who signed a document pledging support for religious freedom. Ready described the priest's trip as "a political burlesque...staged and directed by capable Soviet agents," saying, "What we need from Stalin is his declaration of full religious freedom in Russia, not his signature."

=== Bishop of Columbus ===
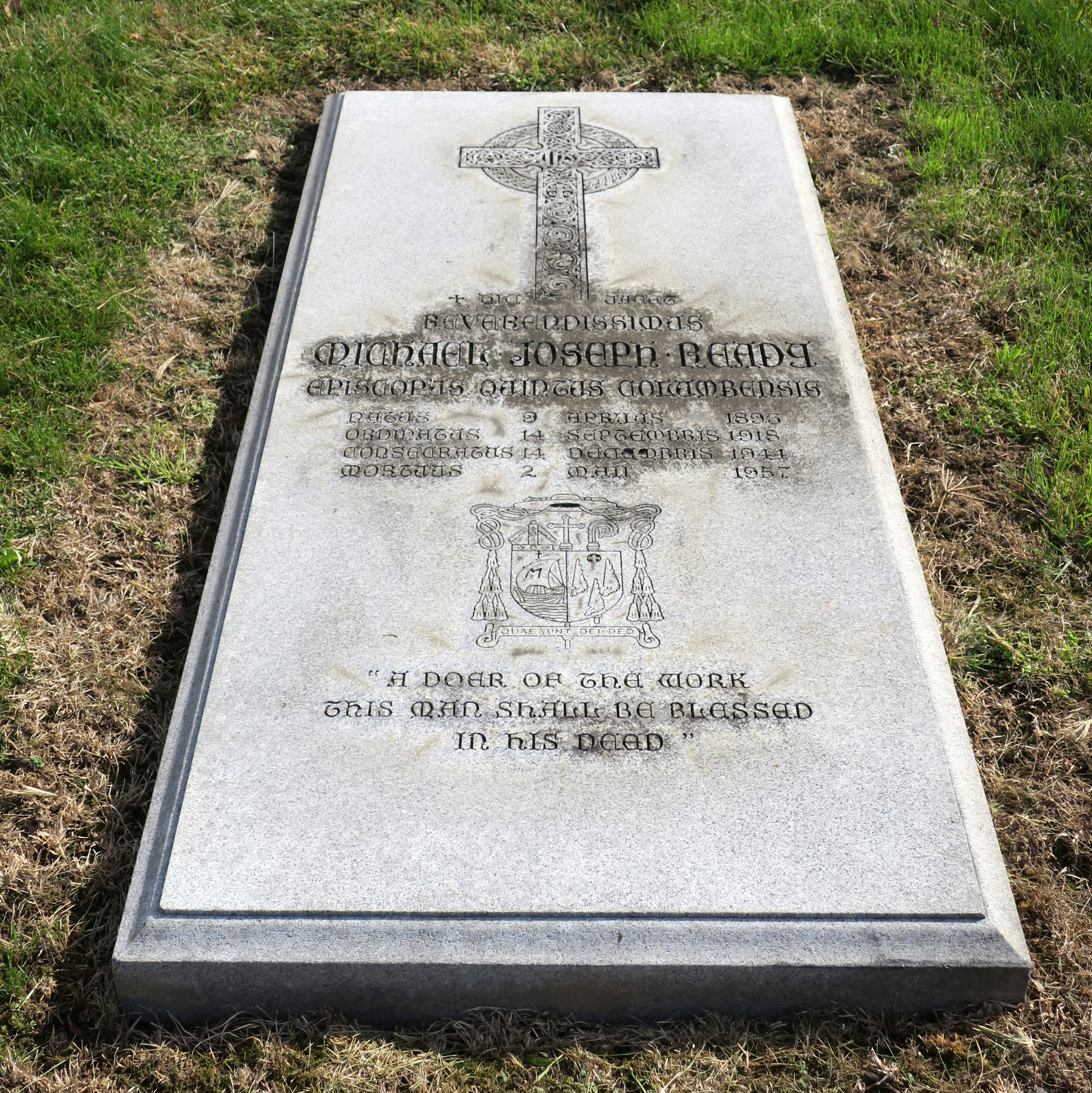
Bishop Ready's grave, St. Joseph Cemetery, Lockbourne, Ohio (2017)

On November 11, 1944, Ready was appointed the fifth bishop of Columbus by Pope Pius XII. He received his episcopal consecration on December 14, 1944, from Archbishop Amleto Cicognani, with Archbishop John McNicholas and Bishop Edward Hoban serving as co-consecrators, at St. Matthew Cathedral in Washington, D.C. He was formally installed at St. Joseph's Cathedral in Columbus, Ohio, on January 4, 1945.

One of Ready's first tasks was overseeing the erection of the Diocese of Steubenville from the eastern and southeastern portions of the Diocese of Columbus, as well as the consolidation of portions of the Archdiocese of Cincinnati into Columbus. He established the Catholic Welfare Bureau and appointed a director of charities for the diocese. Ready criticized the Ohio State University board of trustees decision in 1951 that University President Howard L. Bevis had to approve all campus speakers in advance. During his tenure, Ready also served as chair of the Bishops' Committee on Motion Pictures; he reported that the Hollywood studios were producing more films with "wholesome and moral qualities" in 1952.

Ready also organized the diocesan branch of the Holy Name Society, a Parent-Teacher Organization, the Council of Catholic Women, the Catholic Youth Council, and the St. Vincent de Paul Society in the diocese. He created 18 new parishes and oversaw the construction of nine elementary and five high schools. Ready founded two nursing homes, the diocesan Child Guidance Center, and the Catholic Student Center at Ohio State University. He worked with his fellow Ohio bishops to start the Ohio Catholic Welfare Conference.

=== Death ===
Ready died in Columbus from a cerebral hemorrhage on May 2, 1957, at age 64. He was buried at St. Joseph Cemetery in Lockbourne, Ohio. Bishop Ready High School in Columbus is named in his honor.

Catholic Church titles
Preceded by James Joseph Hartley	Bishop of Columbus; 1944–1957	Succeeded by Clarence George Issenmann
