= Wyandotte Building =

- U.S. National Register of Historic Places
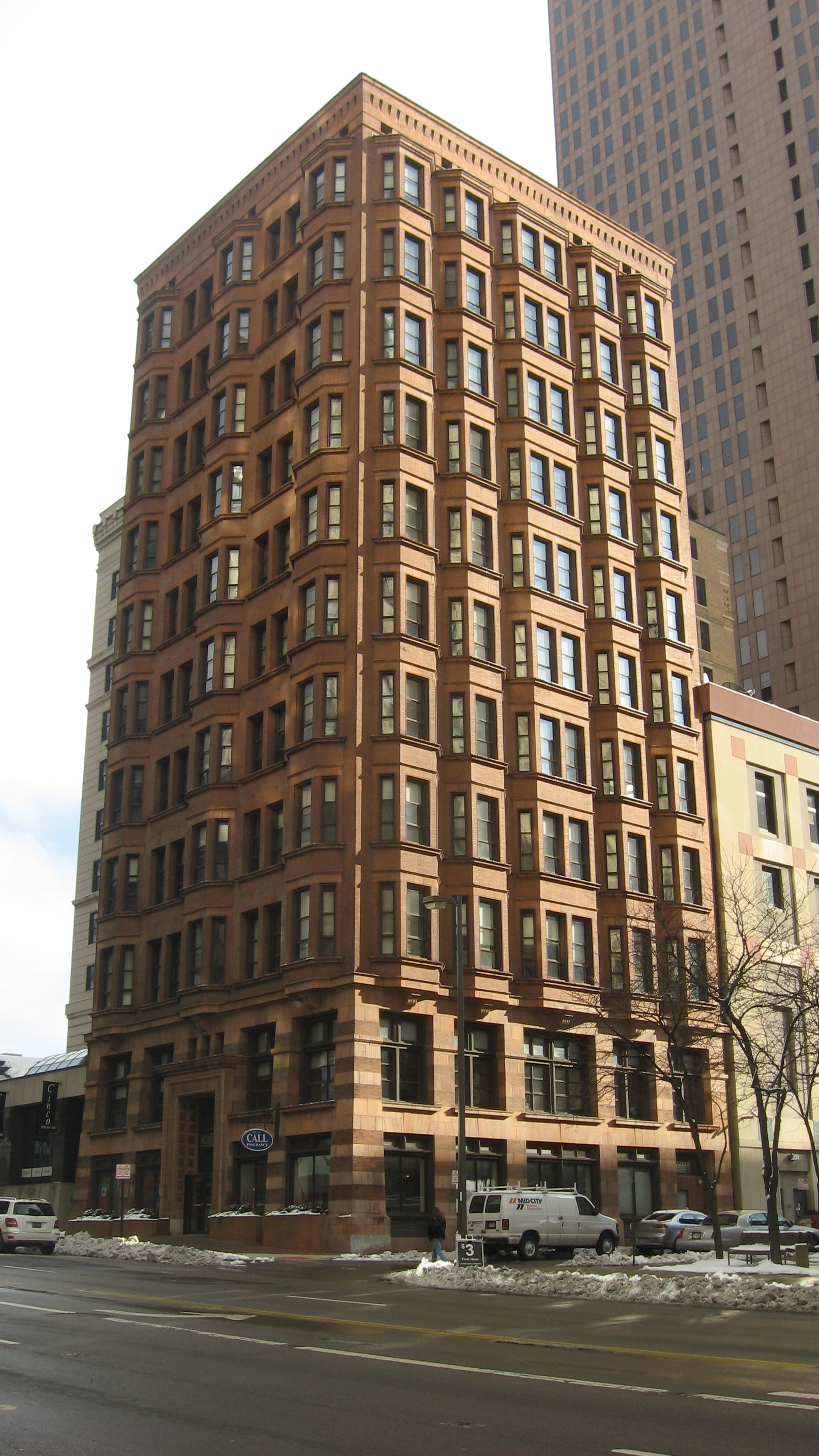
- Interactive map highlighting the building's location
- Location: 21 W. Broad St., Columbus, Ohio
- Coordinates: 39.961898°N 83.001343°W
- Built: 1897-1898
- NRHP reference No.: 72001013
- Added to NRHP: February 23, 1972

The Wyandotte Building is a historic building in Downtown Columbus, Ohio. It was considered the city's first skyscraper, built in 1897-1898 and designed by Daniel Burnham's architectural firm. It is listed on the National Register of Historic Places.

== History ==
The Wyandotte Building was commissioned by John G. Deshler of Deshler National Bank and Associates and opened in 1898, and named for the Wyandot people. It was Columbus' first steel-frame skyscraper at 11 stories. The steel frame building with a tile framed entry is part of the Chicago School of architecture and was built to be fireproof. The facade has vertical rows of bay windows which are intended to provide light, ventilation and extra floor space. The interior has rich wood and marble finishes with terra cotta trimmed arched entries.

It was a commercial failure and in 1916, it was sold to the State of Ohio for use as an office building. The building was surveyed for the Historic American Buildings Survey in 1955. In 1979, it was extensively renovated after the state moved out to the Rhodes State Office Tower in 1974.

In 2014, Huntington Bank purchased the building for $3.6 million, and placed it up for sale a decade later, aiming to redevelop the property.

== Gallery ==
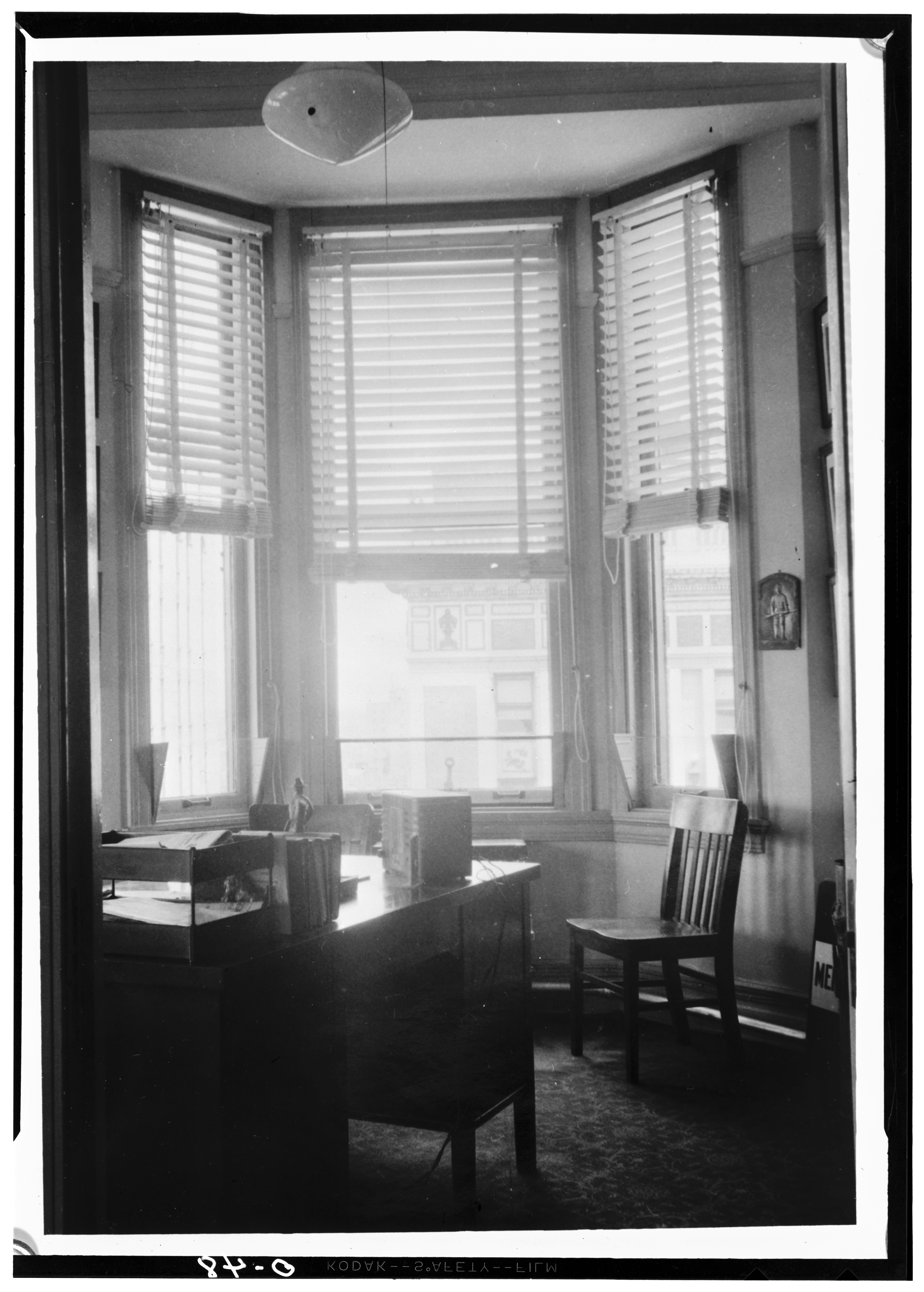
Office interior, 1958

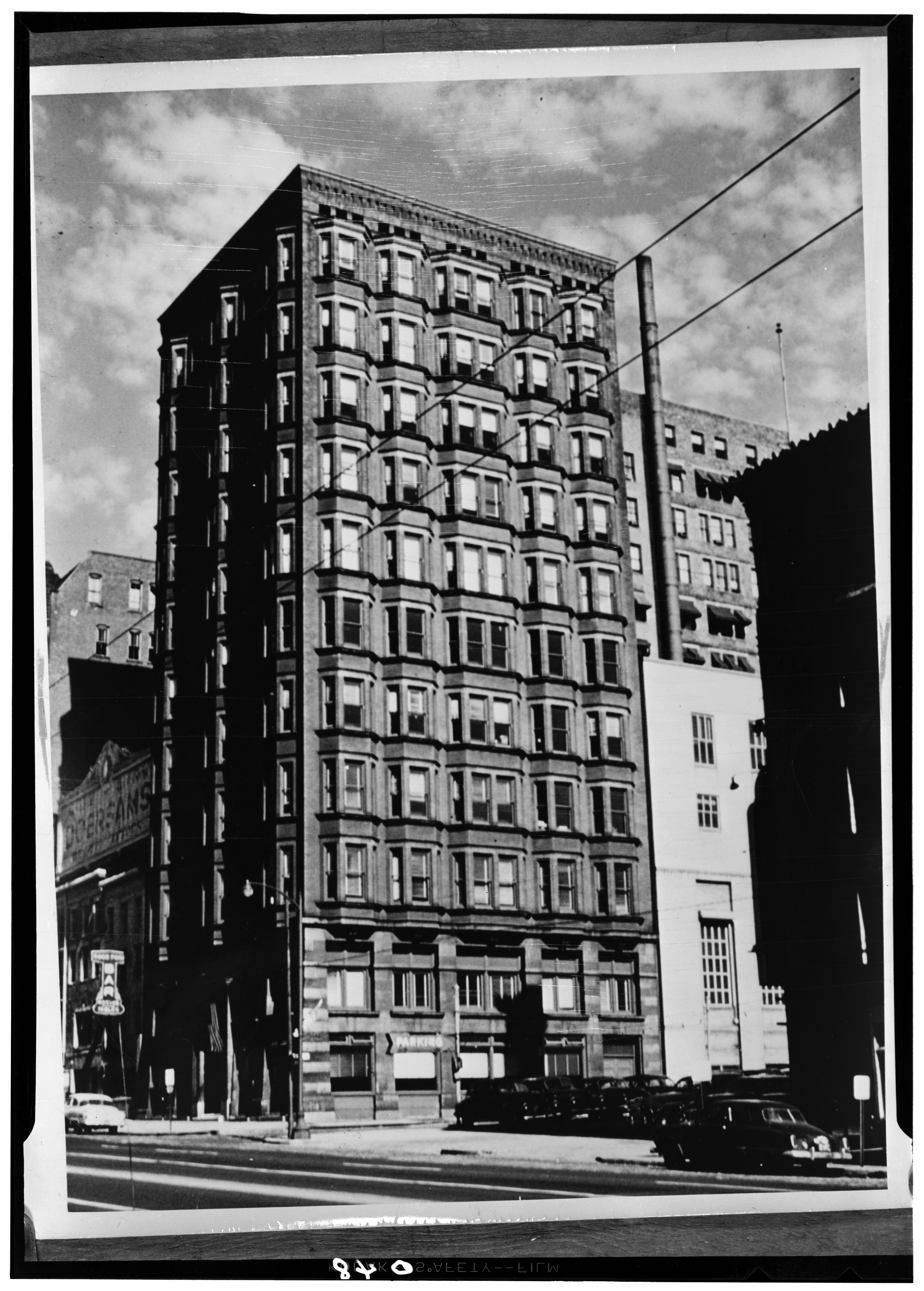
Exterior, 1958

== See also ==
- National Register of Historic Places listings in Columbus, Ohio
