= Deshler Hotel =

Former hotel in Columbus, Ohio, U.S.

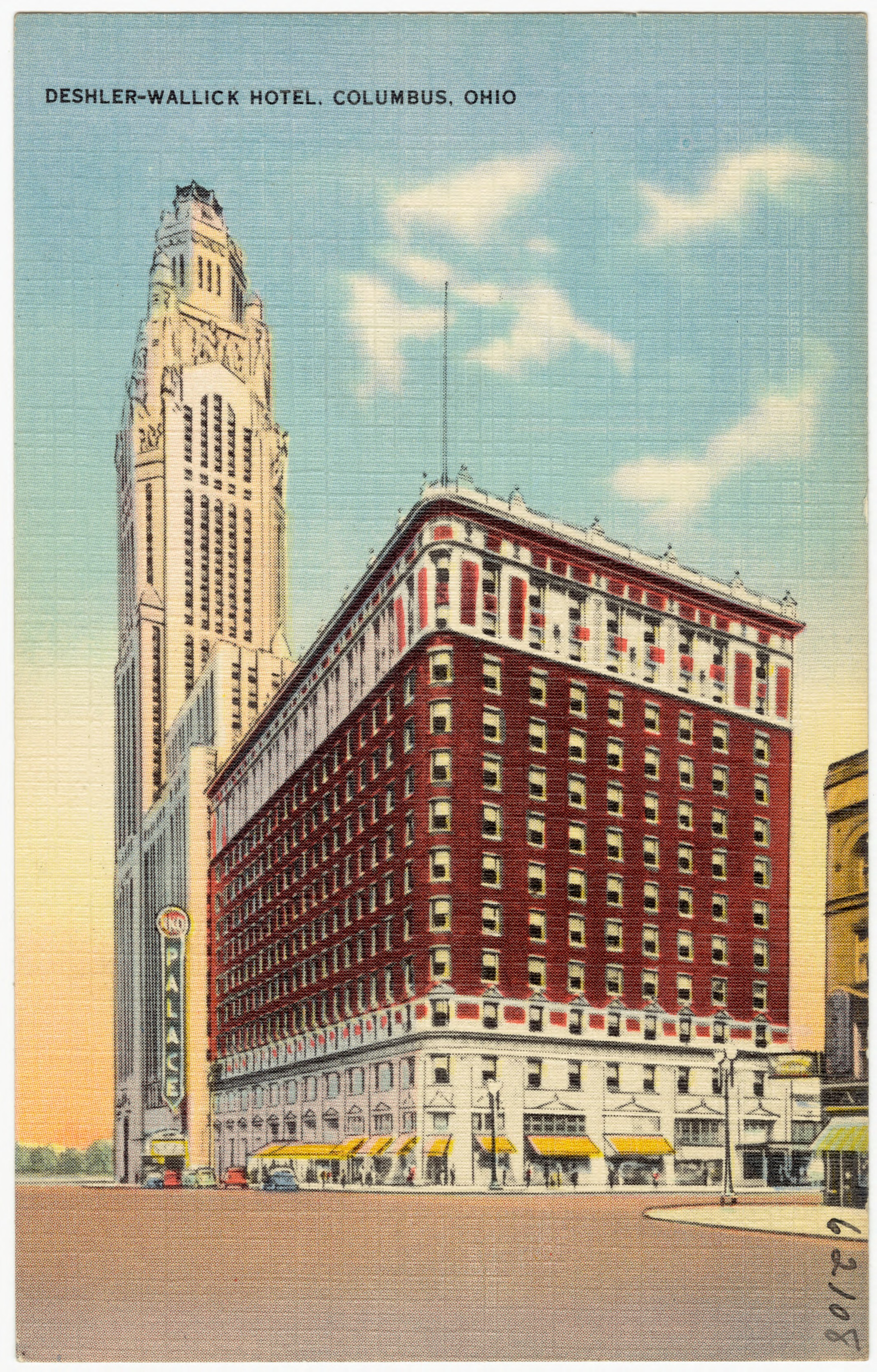
- The Deshler beside the LeVeque Tower, c. 1930-45
- Site of the hotel
- Alternative names: Deshler-Wallick, Deshler Hilton, Deshler-Cole, Beasley-Deshler

General information
- Location: 9 N. High St., Columbus, Ohio
- Coordinates: 39°57′44″N 83°00′04″W
- Opened: August 23, 1916
- Closed: July 31, 1968
- Demolished: 1969

Design and construction
- Architect: Holabird & Roche

The Deshler Hotel, also known as the Deshler-Wallick Hotel, was a hotel building in Downtown Columbus, Ohio. The hotel was located at Broad and High Streets, the city's 100 percent corner.

Announced in 1912 and opened by John G. Deshler in 1916, the hotel originally had 400 rooms, intended to rival the other luxury hotels of the world. The hotel was later leased by Lew and Adrian Wallick, hoteliers from Ohio and New York. Called the Deshler-Wallick Hotel by the time the LeVeque Tower opened, its then-1,000 rooms were accessible by a "venetian bridge" linking the two buildings on the second floor. New York Mayor Jimmy Walker, who attended the opening, tried and nearly succeeded in having a ceremonial sip of wine in each of the 600 hotel rooms. The hotel would later host President Harry S. Truman in 1946 during a meeting of the Federal Council of Churches of Christ. He and Bess Truman would later stay at the hotel again in 1953. In 1947 the hotel sold to Julius Epstein of Chicago, apparently for $2 million, who again sold it five years later to the Hilton Hotels chain, which renamed the hotel the Deshler-Hilton. In 1964 it was sold to a company owned by Charles Cole who renamed it the Deshler-Cole. Cole eliminated the 600 rooms located inside LeVeque Tower and invested $2 million to remodel the hotel. The hotel rooms in the building's wings having been eliminated, the "venetian bridge" was demolished. The building was sold a final time to Fred Beasley in 1966 and renamed the Beasley-Deshler before being closed in 1968 and demolished by S.G. Loewendick & Sons in 1969. Today the site is the home of One Columbus Center, a tower developed in part by LeVeque Enterprises.

The hotel was one of few sites listed in The Green Book in Columbus.

== See also ==
- List of demolished buildings and structures in Columbus, Ohio
