= Hayden Building (Columbus, Ohio) =

- U.S. National Register of Historic Places
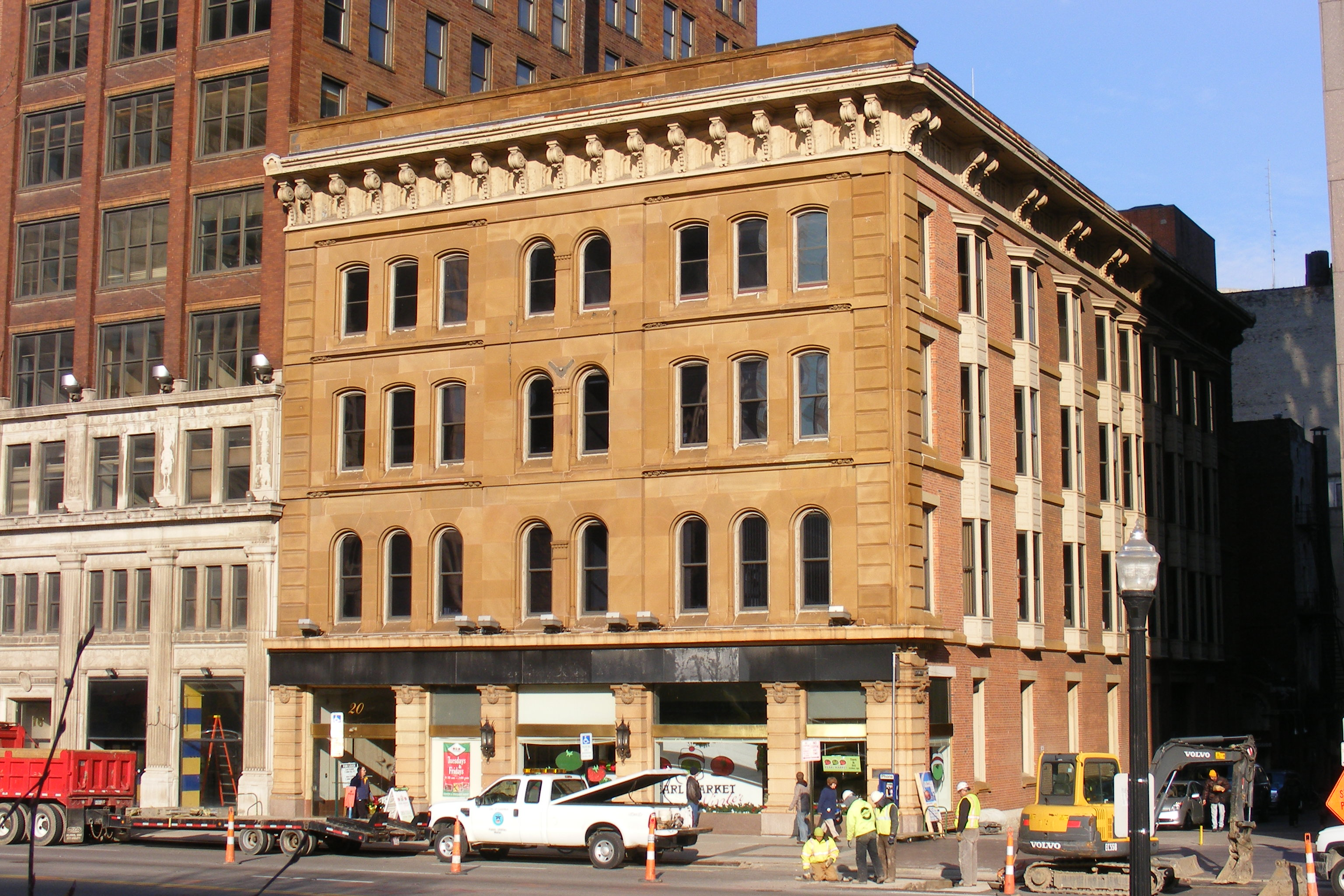
- Interactive map highlighting the building's location
- Location: 20 E. Broad St., Columbus, Ohio
- Coordinates: 39°57′45″N 83°00′00″W
- Area: Less than one acre
- Built: 1869
- Architect: Nathan Kelley
- Architectural style: Italianate/Classical Revival
- NRHP reference No.: 09000412
- Added to NRHP: June 11, 2009

The Hayden Building, also known as the Hayden-Clinton Bank Building, is a historic building on Capitol Square in Downtown Columbus, Ohio. It was listed on the National Register of Historic Places in 2009. Built in 1869, it is one of the oldest remaining commercial buildings on Capitol Square. It was designed by Nathan Kelley, one of the architects of the Ohio Statehouse.

== See also ==
- National Register of Historic Places listings in Columbus, Ohio
