= Edward John Herrmann =

American prelate

His Excellency, The Most Reverend Edward John Herrmann D.D.
- Bishop of Columbus; Titular Bishop of Lamzella
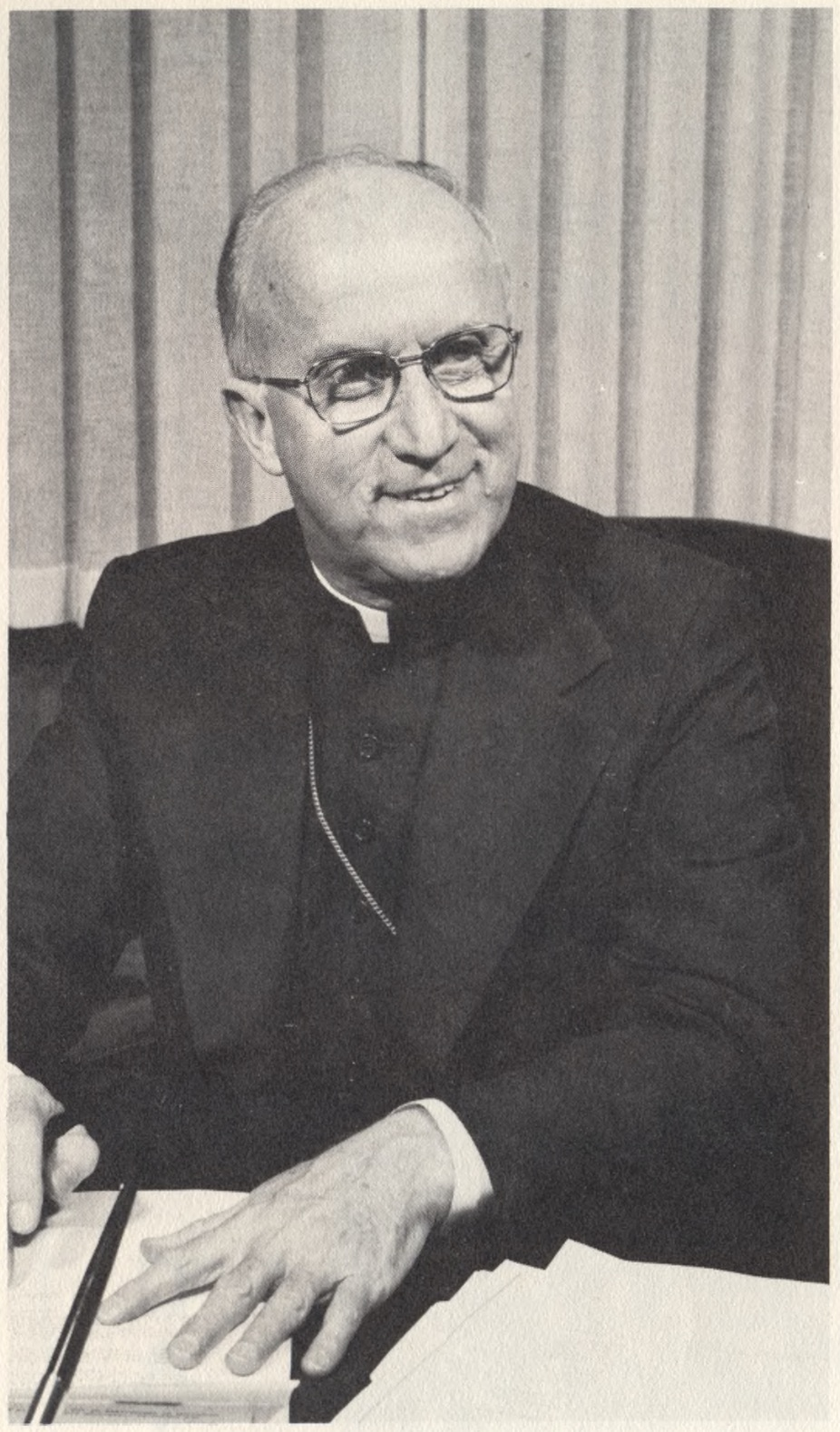
- Church: Roman Catholic Church
- See: Diocese of Columbus
- In office: August 21, 1973— September 18, 1982
- Predecessor: Clarence Edward Elwell
- Successor: James Anthony Griffin
- Other post: Titular Bishop of Lamzella
- Previous posts: Auxiliary Bishop of Washington (1966–1973)

Orders
- Ordination: June 12, 1947 by John Michael McNamara
- Consecration: April 26, 1966 by Patrick O'Boyle

Personal details
- Born: November 6, 1913 Baltimore, Maryland, US
- Died: December 22, 1999 (aged 86) Columbus, Ohio, US
- Education: Mount St. Mary's Seminary
- Motto: That all may be one

Edward John Herrmann (November 6, 1913 – December 22, 1999) was an American prelate of the Roman Catholic Church. He served as bishop of the Diocese of Columbus in Ohio from 1973 to 1982. He previously served as an auxiliary bishop of the Archdiocese of Washington in the District of Columbia and Maryland from 1966 to 1973.

== Biography ==
=== Early life ===
Edward Herrmann was born in Baltimore, Maryland, on November 6, 1913, the son of Episcopalian parents, Walter E. and Jennie Doyle Herrmann, who owned a small grocery store. Walter Herrmann died in the 1918 flu pandemic. Edward Herrmann was baptized a Catholic in 1919.

Herrmann attended St. Bernard and St. James grade schools, then graduated from Loyola High School in Baltimore in 1931. He then went to work for the American Oil Company in Baltimore during the Great Depression. After deciding to enter the priesthood, Herrmann studied at Mount Saint Mary's Seminary in Emmitsburg, Maryland.

=== Priesthood ===
Herrmann was ordained a priest for the Archdiocese of Baltimore on June 12, 1947, in the Cathedral of the Assumption in Baltimore by Auxiliary Bishop John McNamara. He served as pastor and assistant chancellor.

=== Auxiliary Bishop of Washington ===
Pope Paul VI appointed Herrmann as an auxiliary bishop of Washington and titular bishop of Lamzella on March 4, 1966. He was consecrated by Archbishop Patrick O'Boyle on April 26, 1966, at St. Matthew's Cathedral in Washington. Hermann became vicar general and chancellor of the archdiocese.

=== Bishop of Columbus ===
Herrmann was appointed bishop of Columbus on June 26, 1973, by Paul VI; Hermann was installed as its ninth bishop on August 21, 1973.Herrmann helped establish Operation Feed in Columbus, a countywide food drive that now provides millions of meals every year to people in the Columbus area. He also reorganized the diocese into the 15 vicariates and instituted the Emmaus Spirituality Program for priests.

=== Retirement and legacy ===
Pope John Paul II accepted Herrmann's resignation as bishop of Columbus on September 18, 1982. He served as diocesan administrator until April 25, 1983, when Bishop James A. Griffin succeeded him. In retirement, Herrmann resided at St. Ann's Infant and Maternity Home in Avondale, Maryland. However, he returned to Columbus in November 1991 to assist the bishop in the diocese.

Edward Herrmann died on December 22, 1999, in Columbus and was buried in the crypt of St. Joseph Cathedral there.

Catholic Church titles
Preceded by Clarence Edward Elwell	Bishop of Columbus; 1973–1982	Succeeded by James Anthony Griffin
