= Museum of Catholic Art and History =

Museum in Ohio, United States

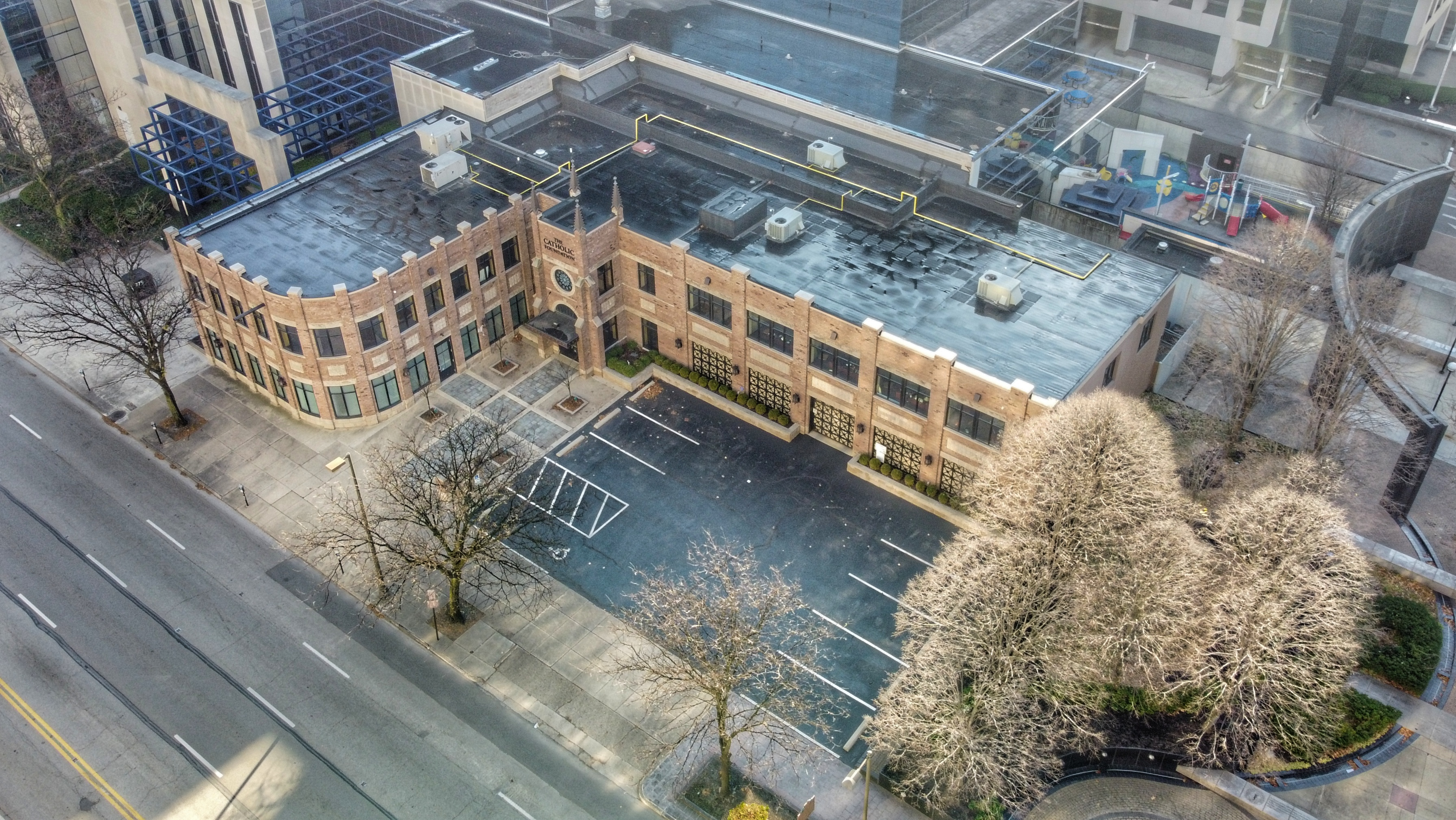
- The Catholic Foundation building housing the museum
- Former name: The Jubilee Museum
- Established: 1998
- Location: 257 E. Broad St.
- Coordinates: 39°57′46″N 82°59′37″W
- Type: Art museum Historical museum
- Collections: Catholic Art
- Founder: Kevin Lutz
- Executive director: Shawn Kenney
- Owner: Diocese of Columbus
- Public transit access: 10
- Parking: Museum lot

The Museum of Catholic Art and History, formerly known as the Jubilee Museum and Catholic Cultural Center, is a museum of Catholic relics and art in Columbus, Ohio. The museum is located on Broad Street in Downtown Columbus, where it reopened in late 2021. The museum was formerly located at the schoolhouse of Holy Family Church in the city's Franklinton neighborhood, from 1998 to 2019.

The museum has the largest collection of diversified Catholic artwork in the United States.

== History ==
=== Founding at Holy Family High School ===
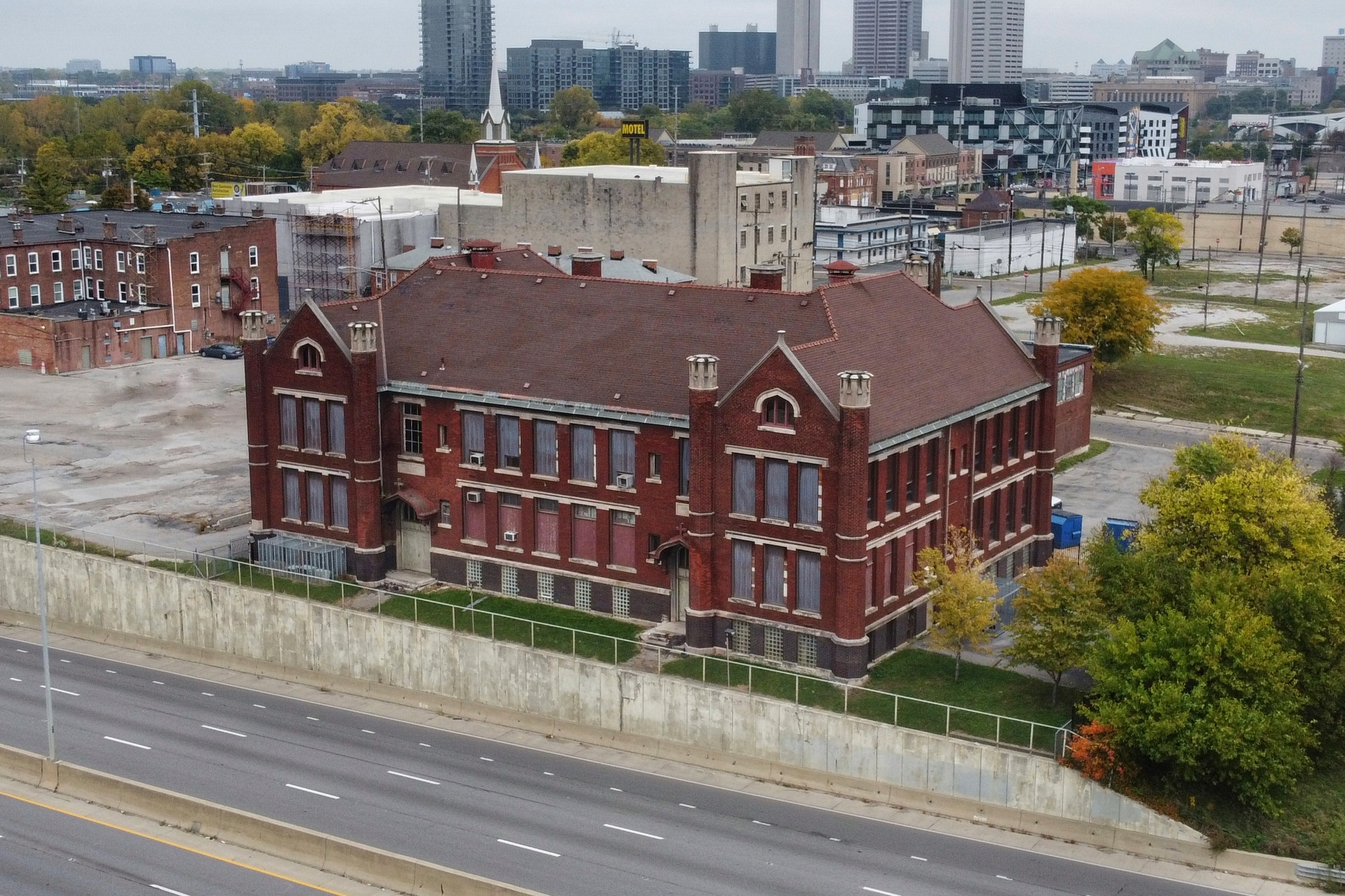
The former Holy Family School in Franklinton

The Museum of Catholic Art and History, a part of the Diocese of Columbus, was founded by Kevin Lutz, a priest of the Diocese. The museum was founded in 1998 at the prompting of bishop James Griffin in honor of the Great Jubilee declared by Pope John Paul II for the year 2000, leading to the original name of the institution, the Jubilee Museum.

The museum was located in the former Holy Family School in Franklinton until 2019. The fortress-like building has Romanesque Revival architecture, including decorative parapets. The Great Flood of 1913 devastated the area, flooding the recently completed building's basement, but providing safety for locals in its upper floors. The building was expanded in the 1930s. The construction of Ohio State Route 315 damaged the neighborhood and almost caused the school building to be destroyed. While the school building survived, the demographic change forced the school's closure and consolidation with Bishop Ready High School in 1964. The building still houses the Holy Family Soup Kitchen & Food Pantry, which serves up to 300 people per day.

Columbus Landmarks listed the building as one of the city's most endangered properties, on its 2020 report, due to development activity surrounding the building, which is adjacent to several other desirable vacant lots. Though the exterior is intact, the original windows have been removed and the spaces filled in. This led the contracted Hardlines Design Company to assess the building as ineligible for listing on the National Register of Historic Places, despite other listed structures in the city lacking their original windows. In 2010, the museum looked into purchasing a closed automobile dealership adjacent to Holy Family Church, where a convent of Sisters of the Good Shepherd had stood until 1965, but due to the high price of the building, the purchase fell through.

In 2018, The Columbus Dispatch featured an appeal from the museum asking for memorabilia from the now-closed all-girls St. Mary of the Springs Academy, run by the Dominican Sisters of St. Mary of the Springs. The high school apostolate of the community closed in 1966.

Because of his work with the museum, Lutz was the first American to be appointed a consultant to the Pontifical Commission for the Cultural Heritage of the Church by Pope John Paul II. The day following his retirement from active ministry in 2019, the diocese announced allegations of sexual abuse of a minor against him. The allegations were found to be credible in June 2020, and Lutz has since retired from any aspect of leadership of the museum, and was removed from ministry by the Diocese.

=== New space at the Catholic Foundation ===
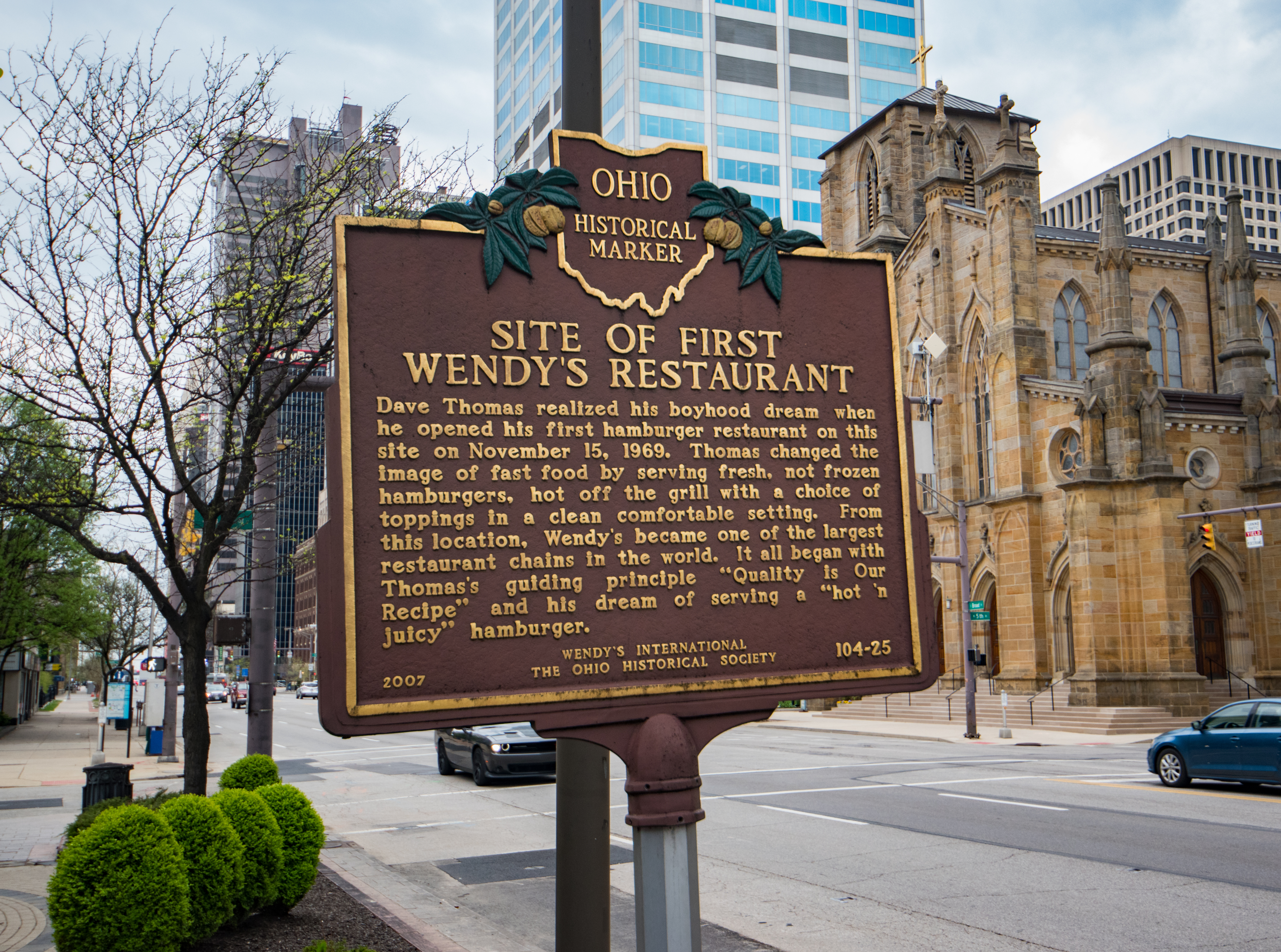
Historical marker outside the building used by the Catholic Foundation and the Museum

The Jubilee Museum closed in August 2019 due to leaks in the roof, and took the opportunity to restructure and take inventory of its collection. During this time, space in the building owned by the Catholic Foundation of Columbus, the nonprofit supporting the diocese, became available. Before its acquisition by the Diocese, this space was the site of the first Wendy's restaurant and housed its corporate headquarters. Prior to this, the building was home Tommy Henrich's Steak House, and was originally built for the Bill Kay Oldsmobile dealership, leading to automotive-themed decor that is still visible.

The new museum building is located near other notable Catholic sites in Columbus – the offices of the Catholic Diocese of Columbus and St. Joseph Cathedral, as well as two other Columbus churches on the National Register of Historic Places: Holy Cross Church, the oldest Christian church in Columbus, and Saint Patrick Church, the Pro-cathedral of the diocese. The new facility is also near the Columbus Museum of Art, Washington Gladden Social Justice Park, Topiary Park, and other attractions in Columbus' Discovery District. The museum was ready to reopen in its new space in March 2020, but the COVID-19 pandemic led the staff to delay their plans. It reopened in the newfound Catholic Foundation building in November 2021, and was renamed the Museum of Catholic Art and History.

The new building has street frontage, is handicap-accessible, and is climate-controlled, improvements over its former location in Franklinton.

The new space is smaller than the museum previously had, and because of this the museum is deaccessioning less important items in its collection. Smaller items were available for purchase by the public shortly before the move. Larger items have been sent to a new cathedral being built in Nigeria and other churches around the world. Stations of the Cross from the famous Daprato Studio previously held by the museum were given to bishop Athanasius Schneider, along with a relic of Augustine of Hippo for a cathedral in Kazakhstan. Workers from the museum have restored and re-installed multiple organs for local churches, and an altar which had initially been found in a bar in St. Louis is now used in St. John Neumann Church in Sunbury, Ohio. Other items have been sent to Mexico and the Philippines, in addition to mission churches in the United States.

The museum has been recognized by Vatican Cardinal Francesco Marchisano, former head of the Pontifical Commission for Sacred Archaeology as being home to the largest collection of diversified Catholic artwork in the United States. It is the top-rated tourist attraction in the city of Columbus.

The museum hopes to grow significantly in the coming years, with multiple major collections including a $10 million manuscript collection to be acquired by the museum soon.

== Collections and exhibits ==
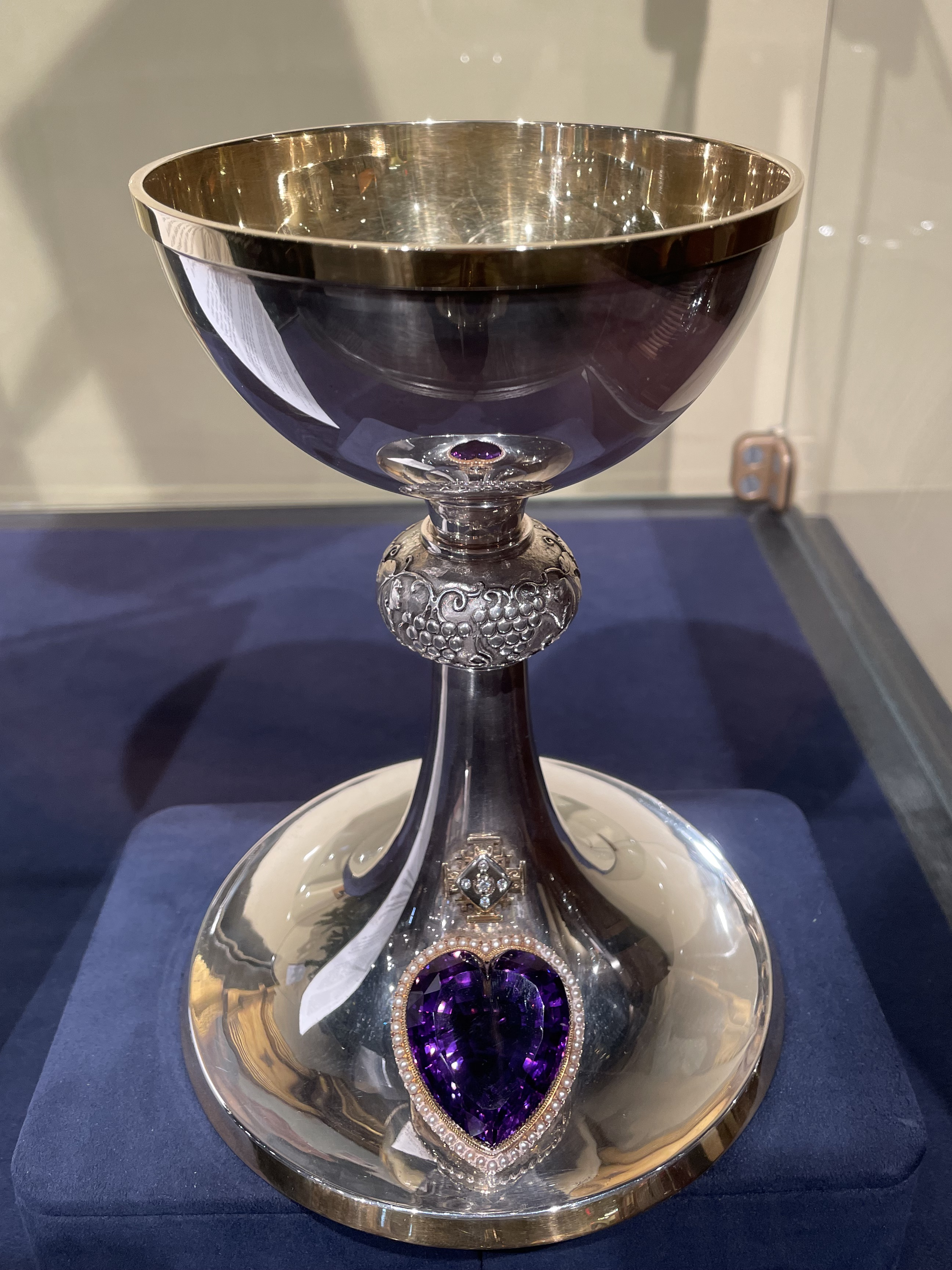
Chalice containing amethyst and pearls once set in a necklace owned by Mary, Queen of Scots at the Museum of Catholic Art and History.

The Museum's purpose is threefold: preservation of historical patrimony in art, liturgy, music; restoration of artistic and liturgical items; and evangelization and education. Notable items in the museum collection include a land grant to the first Catholic settlers of Ohio signed by Thomas Jefferson and James Madison a chalice holding an amethyst and a pearl stone once set on a necklace owned by Mary, Queen of Scots, and Pope Pius IX's snuff box. The museum has attracted audiences with Lego creations, including a 500,000-piece recreation of the Vatican built by a Pennsylvania priest. Museum staff hope to exhibit another church replica once reopened, and host some Lego-building workshops and competitions.

=== The Tridentine Chapel ===
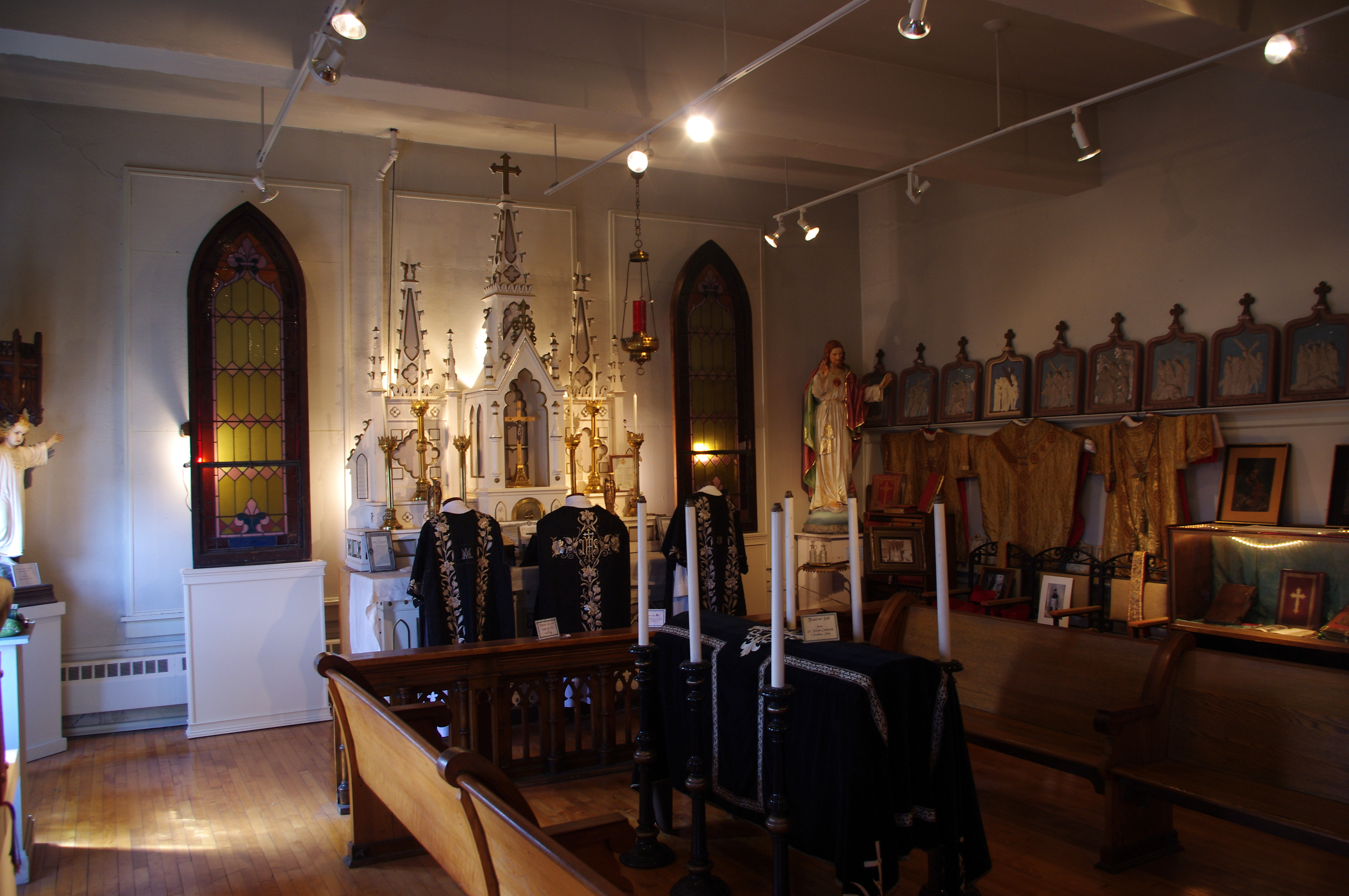
The Tridentine Chapel

This exhibit showcases the museum's holdings related to the Tridentine Mass, containing over 200 missals from 1596 to 1962, along with vestments and a catafalque set up for a Requiem Mass. It also holds a statue of the Christ Child that was of devotional importance to Mother Angelica, founder of EWTN.

=== The Synagogue ===
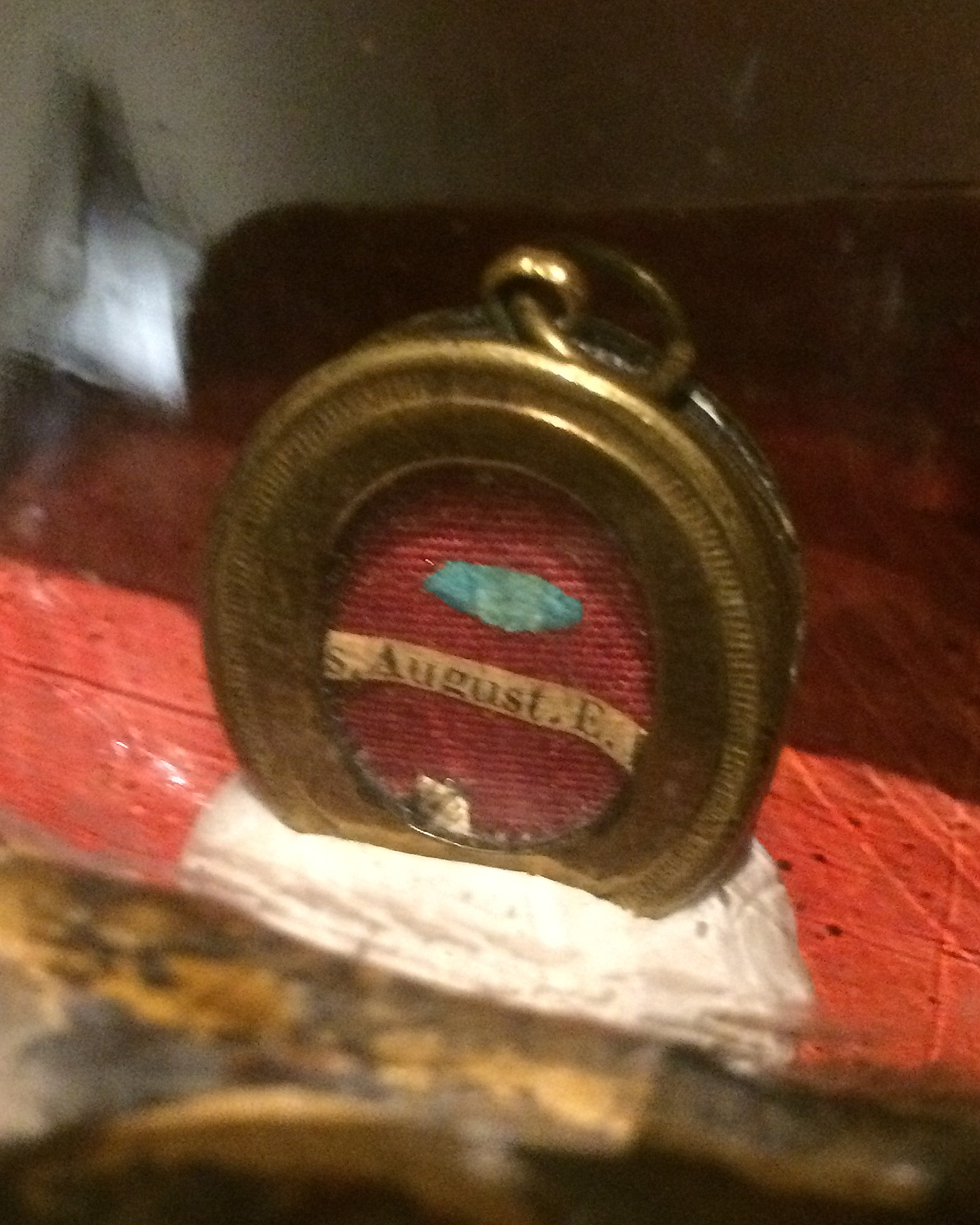
A relic of St. Augustine in the museum's collection

This gallery displays multiple items of Judaica, and highlights the links between Catholicism and Judaism, especially by way of the Old Testament. The collection displays a Hanukkah menorah, a Torah, a Yad, and an original John Singer Sargent painting depicting the Jewish Prophets. In 2015, the museum hosted an exhibit of Holocaust survivor and sculptor Alfred Tibor's work.

=== The Relic Chapel ===
This area exhibits nearly 450 relics of veneration in the Catholic faith, including those of the Twelve Apostles, as well as those of abbots, virgins, confessors, and martyrs, along with their documentation.

=== The Holy Land Collection ===
Many of the items in this collection are from the Franciscan Monastery of the Holy Land in America. These include a 2nd-century Roman pilum of the same type that pierced the side of Jesus, coins such as one of the same type as the widow's mite referred to in the Gospel, pottery that date to the time of Christ, vestments, and sacred vessels.

=== St. Peter's Room ===
This area contains the stained-glass windows, pews, altar, and other artifacts from St. Peter's Church, a Catholic parish of the Diocese that was closed in the 1970s. Two of the original bells of the church are also held by the museum, with the third having been stolen before the church's demolition in May 1970.

=== The Pope and Bishop Room ===
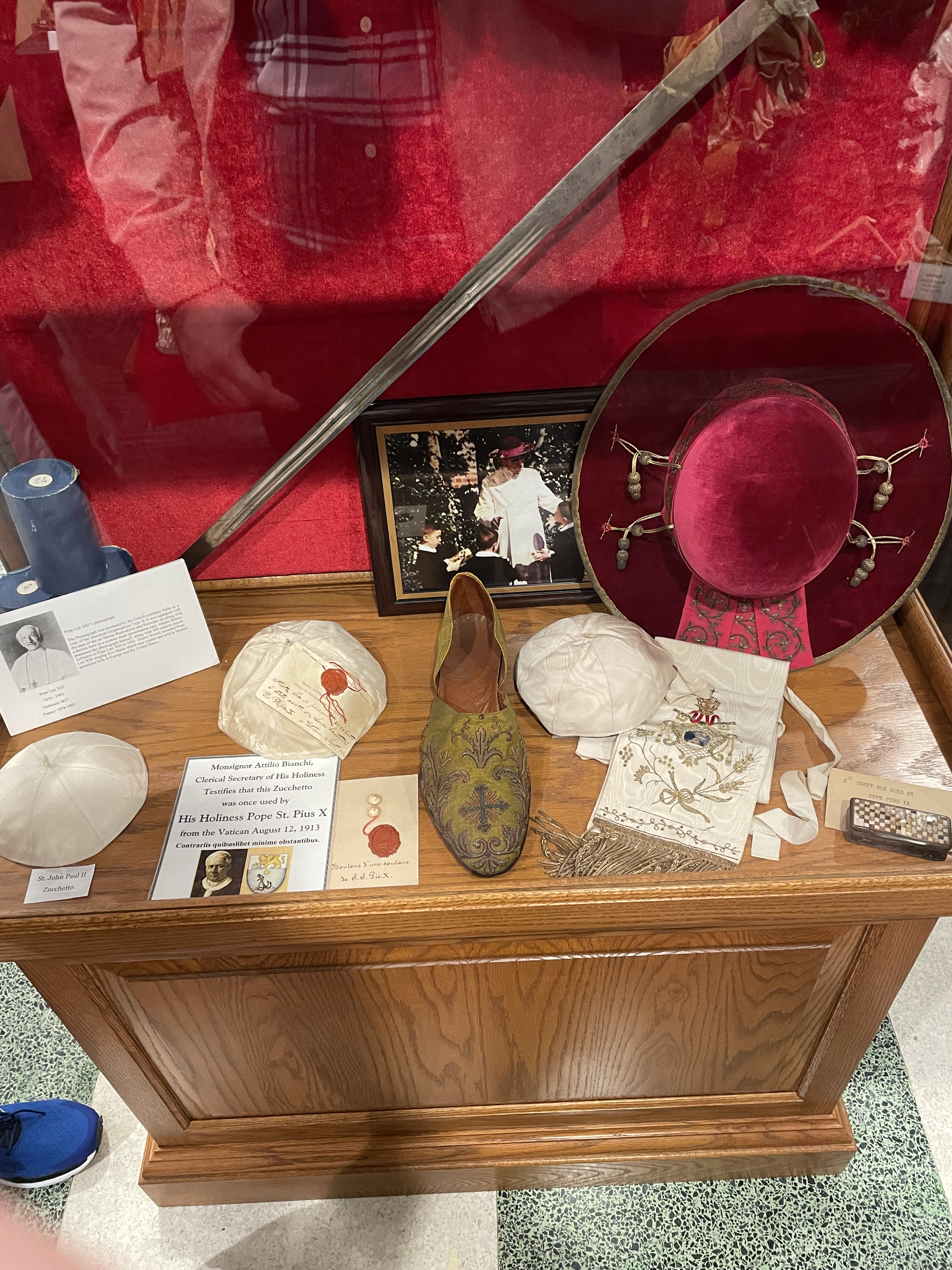
Display case with papal artifacts including a fascia of Pius XII's, Pius IX's snuff box, and original film of Leo XIII at the Museum of Catholic Art and History.

This exhibit contains items such as the full or partial libraries of five Columbus bishops, a fascia worn by Pope Pius XII, of which very few are extant, the full preconciliar choir dress of a cardinal, a handwritten letter from Pope Leo XIII, vestments belonging to archbishop John Carroll, the first bishop of America, made from his mother's wedding dress, and a piece from Pope John Paul I's cassock.

=== Nativity Room ===
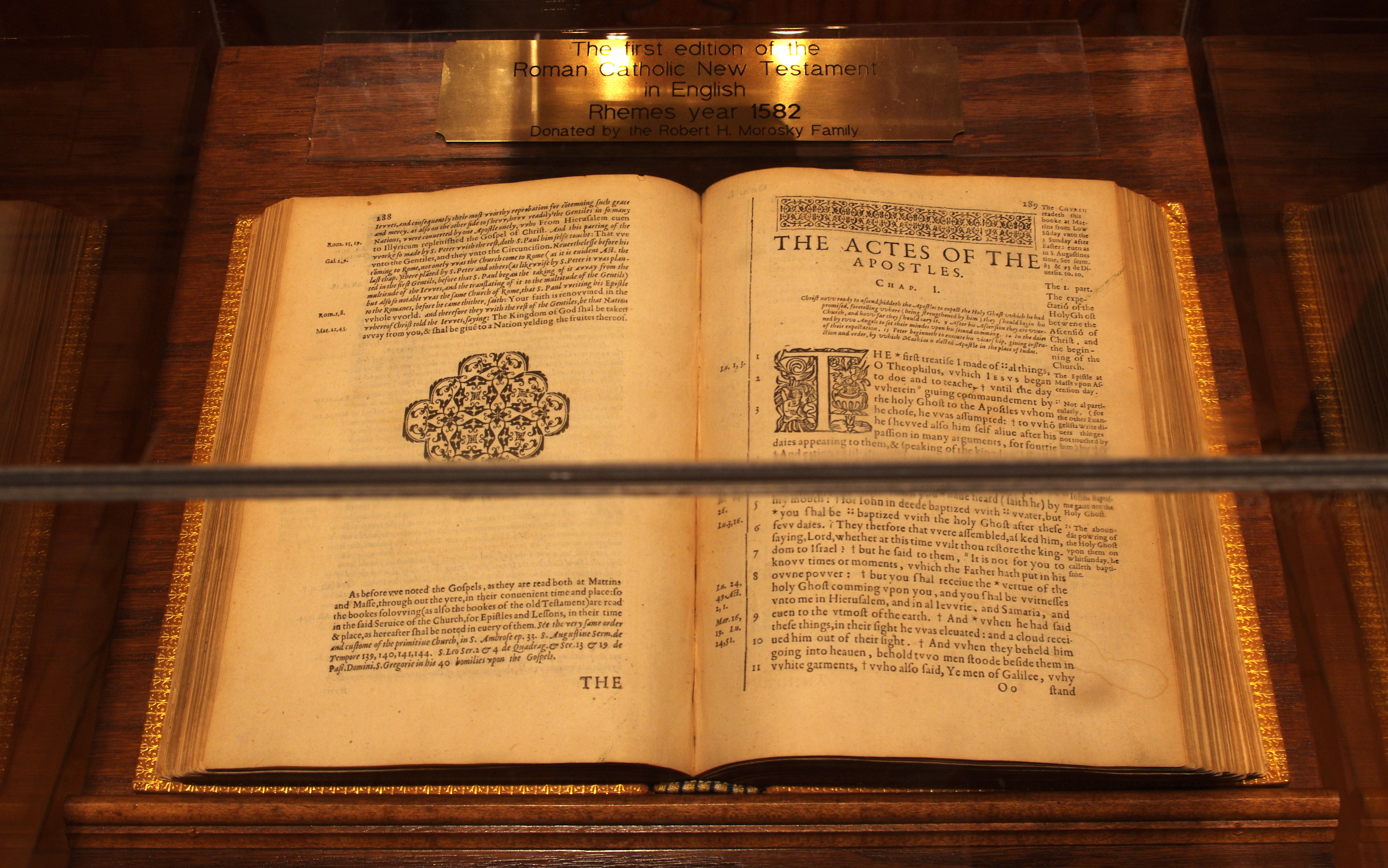
A first-edition copy of the Douay-Rheims bible of 1582 at the museum

One of the most popular showcases of the museum is its collection of 500 nativity scenes, which are often put on display during the Christmas season, one of which is the largest Fontanini sets in the United States. Other sets are from Sri Lanka, Ethiopia, Peru, and Germany. One depicts the Holy Family in traditional Zulu attire. In 2023, State Auto Insurance donated its historic Christmas Corner nativity scene, formerly displayed at 518 East Broad since 1962, to the Museum to be displayed on the lawn of St. Joseph Cathedral.

=== Bible Room ===
The museum has facsimile editions of the Gutenberg Bible and the original King James Bible, along with an edition of the Latin Vulgate dating from 1563. Also notable is a first-edition printing of the Douay–Rheims Bible.

=== The Convent Room ===
This portion of the museum is dedicated to items related to religious sisters, such as the ballot box for electing a superior, a device used to call children to prayer, and a metal implement used by Sisters of the Holy Cross to fold their veils. Also on display are mannequins wearing the habits of various orders, including the Franciscan Sisters of Penance and Christian Charity, the Daughters of Charity, Dominican Sisters of St. Mary of the Springs, and the Sisters of Charity of Nazareth.

Other exhibits have included ones focused upon Black Catholic heritage, military chaplains, global art depicting the Crucifixion of Jesus, and Catholic music.

== Notable visitors ==
- Eduard Habsburg-Lothringen, archduke of Austria
- Cardinal Francis Arinze
- Archbishop Athanasius Schneider
- Cardinal Francesco Marchisano
- Cardinal Jorge María Mejía
