= Holy Family Church (Columbus, Ohio) =

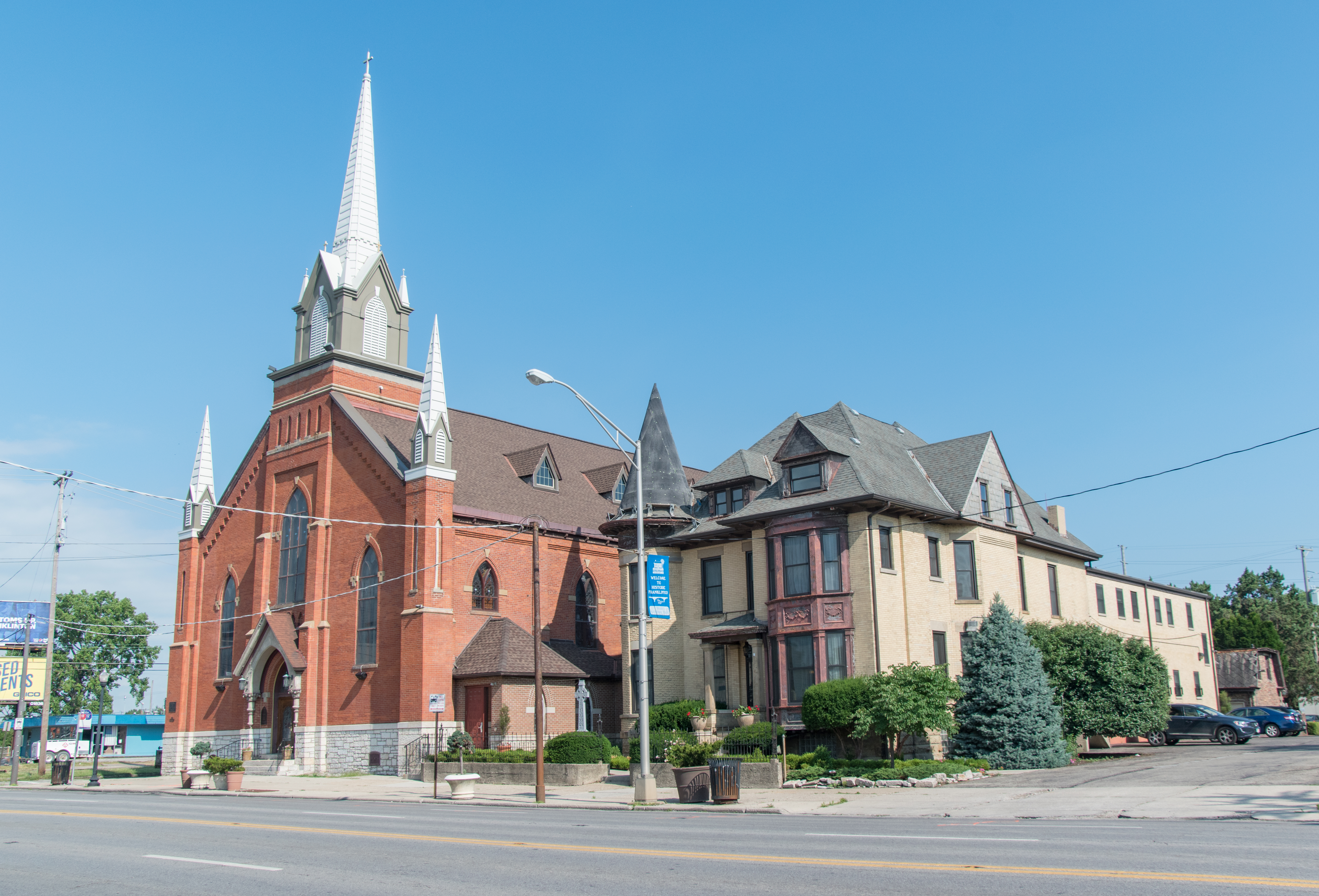
- Holy Family Church
- 39.9606°N 83.0166°W
- Location: 584 W. Broad Street, Columbus, Ohio
- Denomination: Catholic
- Religious institute: Mercedarians
- Website: holyfamilycolumbus.org

History
- Founded: 1877
- Founder: Fr. R.C. Christy
- Dedication: June 2, 1889

Architecture
- Architect: Michael Harding
- Architectural type: Gothic Revival

Specifications
- Capacity: 1,000

Administration
- Diocese: Diocese of Columbus

Clergy
- Bishop: Earl Fernandes
- Pastor(s): Father Michael Donovan, O de M

Holy Family Church is a parish church of the Roman Catholic Diocese of Columbus, in the Franklinton neighborhood of Columbus, Ohio. The congregation was founded in 1877, making it the fourth-oldest Catholic church in the city of Columbus. The current church was completed in 1889 and Mercerdarians took over pastoral care and administration of the church in 2022.

== History ==
Holy Family Church is situated in Franklinton, the oldest neighborhood in Columbus. The Catholic population of the early 1850s consisted of only a few families, augmented for a short time by a small number of laborers who were constructing the National Road. Before 1833 Mass was celebrated occasionally in the homes of the few Catholic families. The original courthouse of Franklin county was several times used for Catholic services, as also were the homes of Vincent Grate and Henry Nadenbusch, the latter of whom furnished much of the limestone for the first Catholic church built in Columbus, St. Remigius.

The Sisters of the Good Shepherd founded a convent on the southwest corner of Broad and Sandusky Streets in 1865, and Mass was first regularly held on the West Side there. They were intended, however, for the members of the convent only. By special privilege, the Catholics living nearby attended Mass in the private chapel of the convent on Sundays and holy days of obligation.

In 1871 Bishop Sylvester Rosecrans established St. Aloysius Seminary for the preparation of young men for the priesthood, on property purchased for the purpose from the Sullvant family. This site is now occupied by the Holy Family School. In the chapel of the seminary daily Mass was offered, but only seminarians were allowed to be present.

Within a few years, preparations were made for the formation of a congregation with a priest and church of its own. The object of the people's endeavors was accomplished by Bishop Rosecrans when he found it necessary to close the Seminary in the summer of 1876, owing to lack of support. The property was given to the Sisters of St. Joseph of Baden from Ebensburg, Pennsylvania, for their use as a day and boarding school for young boys. The school was opened in the spring of 1877 by three sisters under the direction of Mother Hortense Tello, thereby founding the first Catholic school on the West Side. Fr. R.C. Christy was appointed chaplain for both groups of sisters by bishop Rosecrans in April 1877. It was while serving in this capacity that Father Christy became interested in the plans for a parish on the West Side. A building on the premises of the seminary was neatly arranged to serve as a temporary chapel for the young congregation. For two months, Mass was held in what had formerly been used as a barn.

=== Parish founding ===
Eventually, Christy acquired a church, formerly occupied by the United Brethren, on the comer of Sandusky and Shepherd Streets, adjoining the seminary. A contract was written for the purchase of the church, but the legal transfer was never made owing to a defect in the title, causing the property to remain in litigation for several years. In the meantime Father Christy had the church remodeled and arranged according to the requirements of a Catholic place of worship, and on Friday, June 8, 1877, the Feast of the Sacred Heart of Jesus, he celebrated Mass there for the first time and dedicated the structure. The choir of Holy Cross Church furnished the music as a tribute of the oldest Catholic Church in the city to the youngest.

Fr. Christy soon had a congregation of about forty families, with a school under the care of the Sisters of St. Joseph. After being pastor for one year, failing health forced Christy to step down, and he soon died at St. Francis Hospital.

On October 16, 1878, Fr. T. S. Reynolds, who had been placed in charge of the parish in June 1878, was succeeded by Fr.. W. F. Hayes, who was appointed pastor in January, 1879. Father Hayes recognized the fact that the property then occupied by the congregation, formerly owned by the United Brethren, could not be legally held and must be sold to satisfy the claims of mortgages under the former ownership. The Catholics had as yet made no payments on the property but had expended much money in improving it. At the sale made by order of court Father Hayes surrendered the property to the United Brethren.

Arrangements were made to rent the building and continue possession of it for church and school purposes until other property could be acquired by the congregation. On April 1, 1881, Father Hayes came into possession of the four lots and a residence situated on the northeast corner of Broad and Skidmore Streets, the present site of the church, rectory and convent.

=== Current church ===
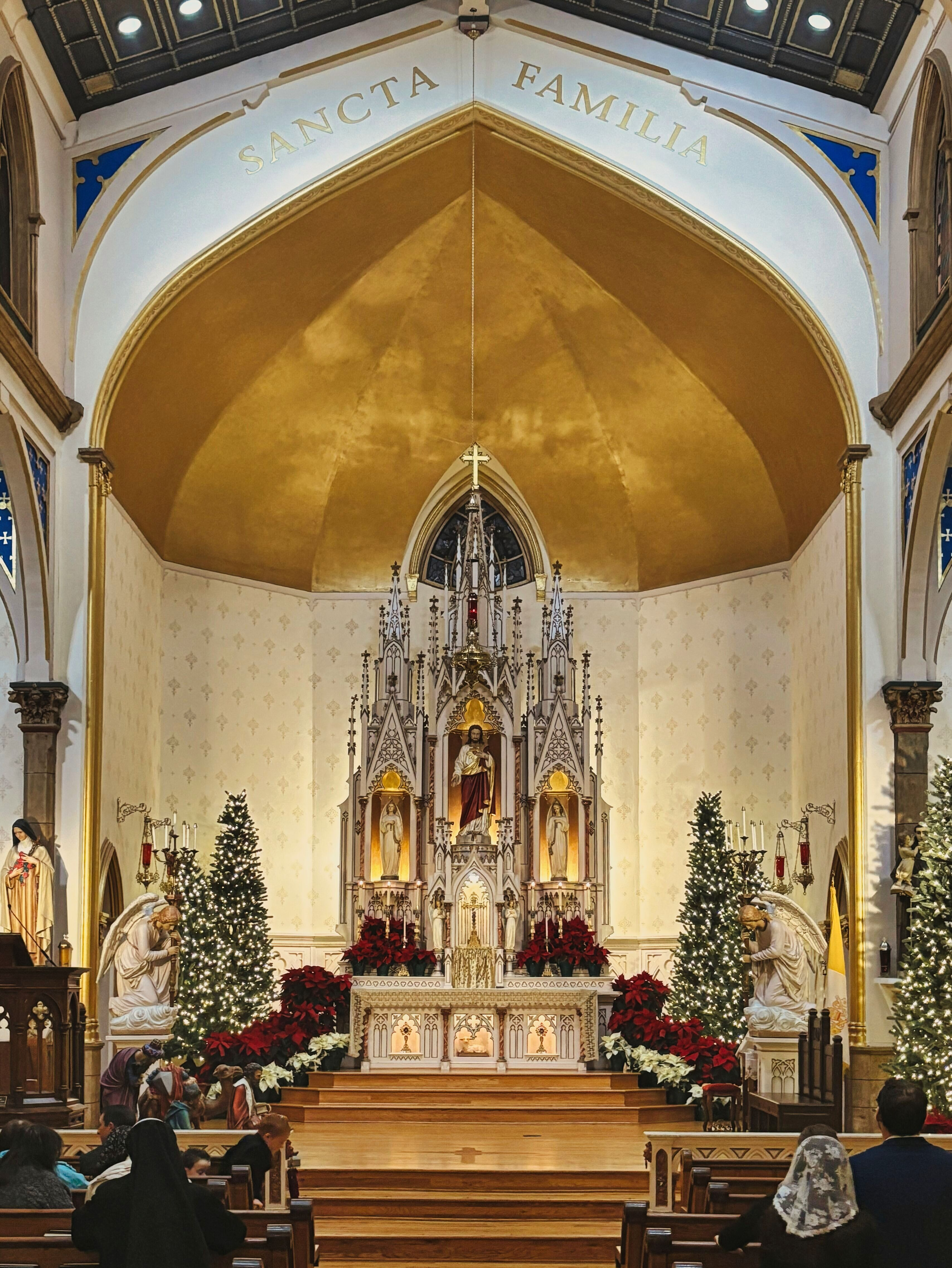
Church sanctuary with Christmas decoration

Preparations were immediately begun for building a church to serve the purposes of a school in its basement. The work was carried on as means permitted, the principal sources of income being house to house collections, and entertainments. On September 17, 1882, the cornerstone was laid by Bishop John Watterson. It was determined by the parish to finish the foundations and then cover them until the congregation had the resources to finish the church.

On October 31, 1884, Fr. Dennis A. Clarke was appointed to succeed Father Hayes as pastor of Holy Family. After High Mass on Sunday, November 16, a meeting of the men of the congregation was held in the school room of the old building to develop plans to finish the new church, the foundations of which had laid covered for nearly two years, and Michael Harding was selected as the architect.

In May 1885 the foundations were readied and the bricklaying began. It was determined to finish the entire basement, and construct a temporary chapel with classrooms separated from it by a hallway running full length of the building.

The upper part or main auditorium was floored and enclosed with temporary windows. The basement being finished, Mass was held therein for the first time on Sunday, March 7, 1886. Father Clarke the pastor, sang the High Mass and Father White, the rector of St. Joseph Cathedral, preached an appropriate sermon.

The basement chapel continued to be used during the winter months. In the summer the main church auditorium was arranged with an altar, chairs and other furniture, and services held there. In September 1886 the first mission was given in the church by the Redemptorist Fathers.

During the autumn of 1888 contracts for the plastering and completing of the interior were made and the work went on during the winter. Stained glass windows made by artists from Munich were put in place and a handsome main altar was built. Thus far completed, without side altars or pews, the edifice was solemnly dedicated on Sunday, June 2, 1889, by Bishop Watterson, After the dedication, solemn High Mass was sung by Fr. Hayes, who as previous pastor of Holy Family, laid the foundations of the church.

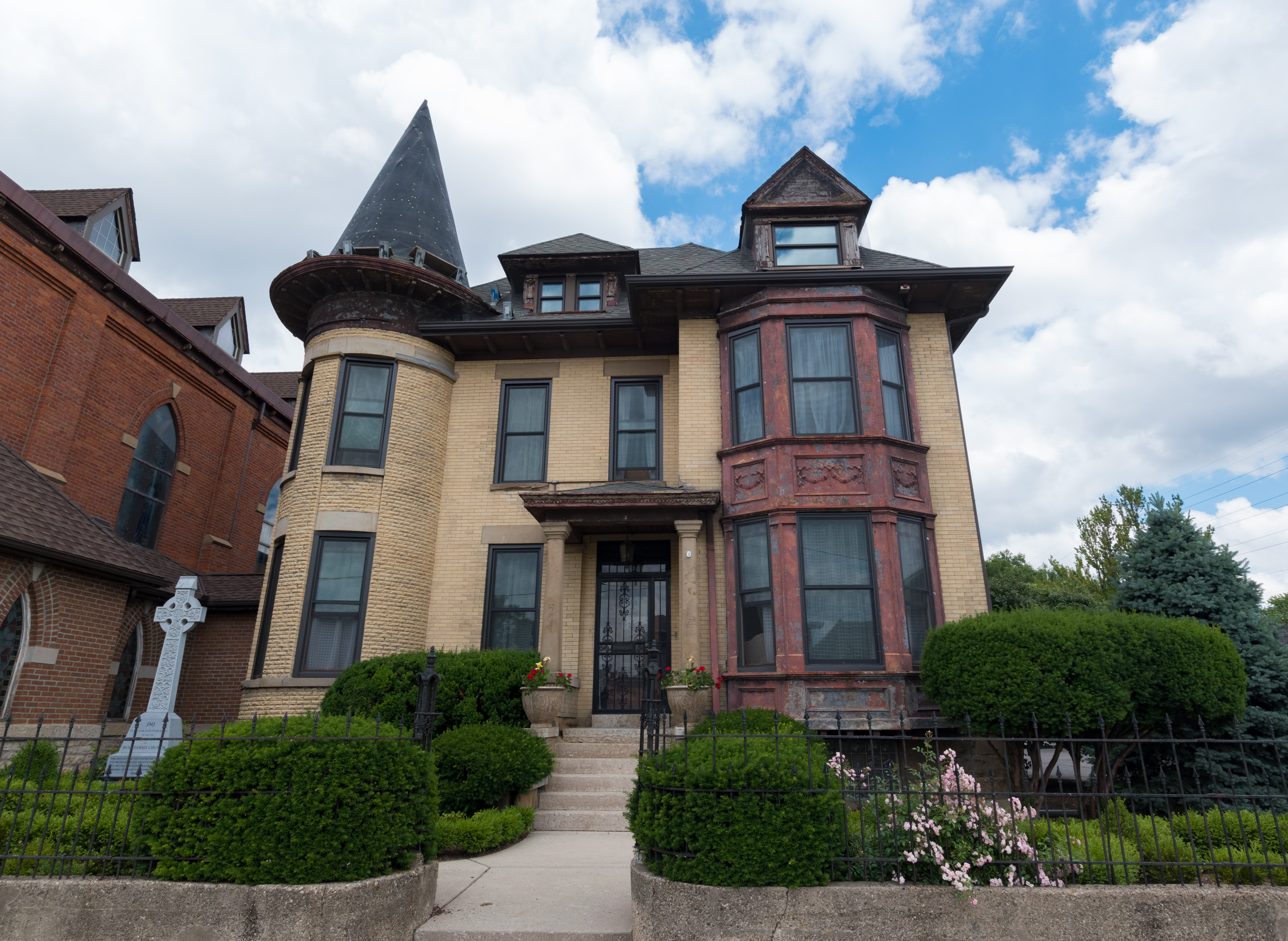
Holy Family Rectory

In building the church, Fr. Clarke determined to avoid borrowing large sums of money so the parish was not burdened with heavy debt and consequent interest payments. Only that which was necessary was purchased and only when money was provided for it. In August 1890, the side altars and pews were placed in the Church and the pipe organ built. In the fall of 1896 a steam-heating plant was installed in the church, and in 1900 the current rectory was built.

At the diocesan synod held in 1902, Holy Family was made a deanery with the pastor as dean.

Due to the growth of the parish, the basement school was no longer large enough to serve the congregation. A fund for the purpose of building a dedicated school had been created once the church was out of debt. A suitable site was offered in the property of what used to be St. Aloysius Seminary. As it was no longer likely that this property would again be used by the diocese, Bishop Henry Moeller, transferred it to the parish for $8,500.

In September, 1911 ground was broken for the new school, the foundation laid and then covered for the winter and spring. The cornerstone was laid by Moeller on the 13th of September, 1912. The intention was to have as much of the building ready as possible by the following spring. The structure had just been enclosed in preparation for the completion a large part of the interior, when the Great Flood of 1913 occurred, causing large amounts of damage to the church basement and school, and delaying the work on the new building.

The flood, almost ruined the parish, as most of the parish members suffered serious loss, and in many instances their homes were entirely swept away. The destruction of property caused over one hundred families of the congregation to move homes and subsequently parishes. Seven children and five adults of the parish were drowned and many others died in consequence of diseases contracted or exposure during the flood.

Despite the setback of the flood, the parish opened the new school on March 25, 1914—first anniversary of the flood. The Sisters of St. Joseph were in charge of the school from its foundation in 1877 to June 1912 with the exception of 1883–1884, when they were temporarily withdrawn.

The Sisters of Mercy from Louisville, Kentucky, became the teachers in September 1912. A commercial High School was opened in September 1817, operated by nine sisters at the time In 1921, a four-year classical course of studies was added, and in 1940 a new building was added for the elementary school. The high school stopped accepting students in 1960 due to the opening of Bishop Ready High School and the last Holy Family high school graduates were the class of 1964.

=== 1950s to present-day ===
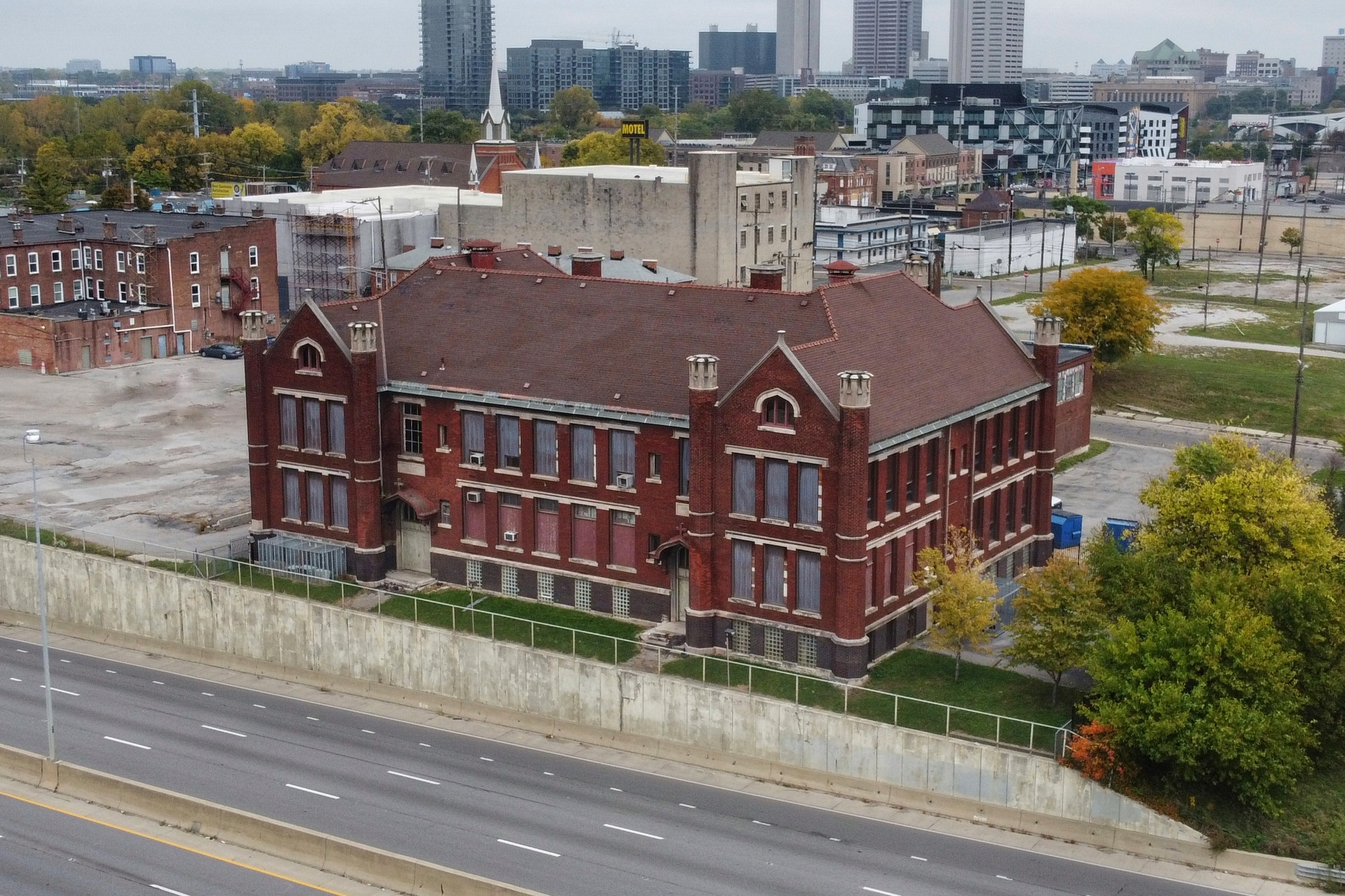
The former Holy Family School, later the Jubilee Museum

The construction of the Interstate Highway System in Columbus uprooted many families from the parish and nearly required the demolition of the high school building, but the parish recovered, growing from 150 families in 1968 to 328 in 1989 to 500 families in 2022.

The church also offered the Tridentine Mass from 2001 until 2019, when Saint Leo Oratory was established to serve the needs of the traditional Catholic community of Columbus.

The Bridgettine Sisters established a convent at the parish in 2018 at the invitation of bishop Frederick Campbell, and are planning on opening a house of hospitality adjacent to the parish.

Until a 2021 move, the parish high school building was home to the Jubilee Museum and Catholic Cultural Center, the largest institution of its kind in the United States according to Cardinal Francesco Marchisano.

In January 2022, the Order of the Blessed Virgin Mary of Mercy, otherwise known as Mercedarians, sent two priests to the parish at the invitation of then-bishop of Columbus Robert J. Brennan. The order plans to establish a house for student brothers attending the Pontifical College Josephinum in the convent on the property.

The parish has run a food pantry since 1985 that feeds about 6,000 people a month.
