= State Automobile Mutual Insurance Company =

American insurance company

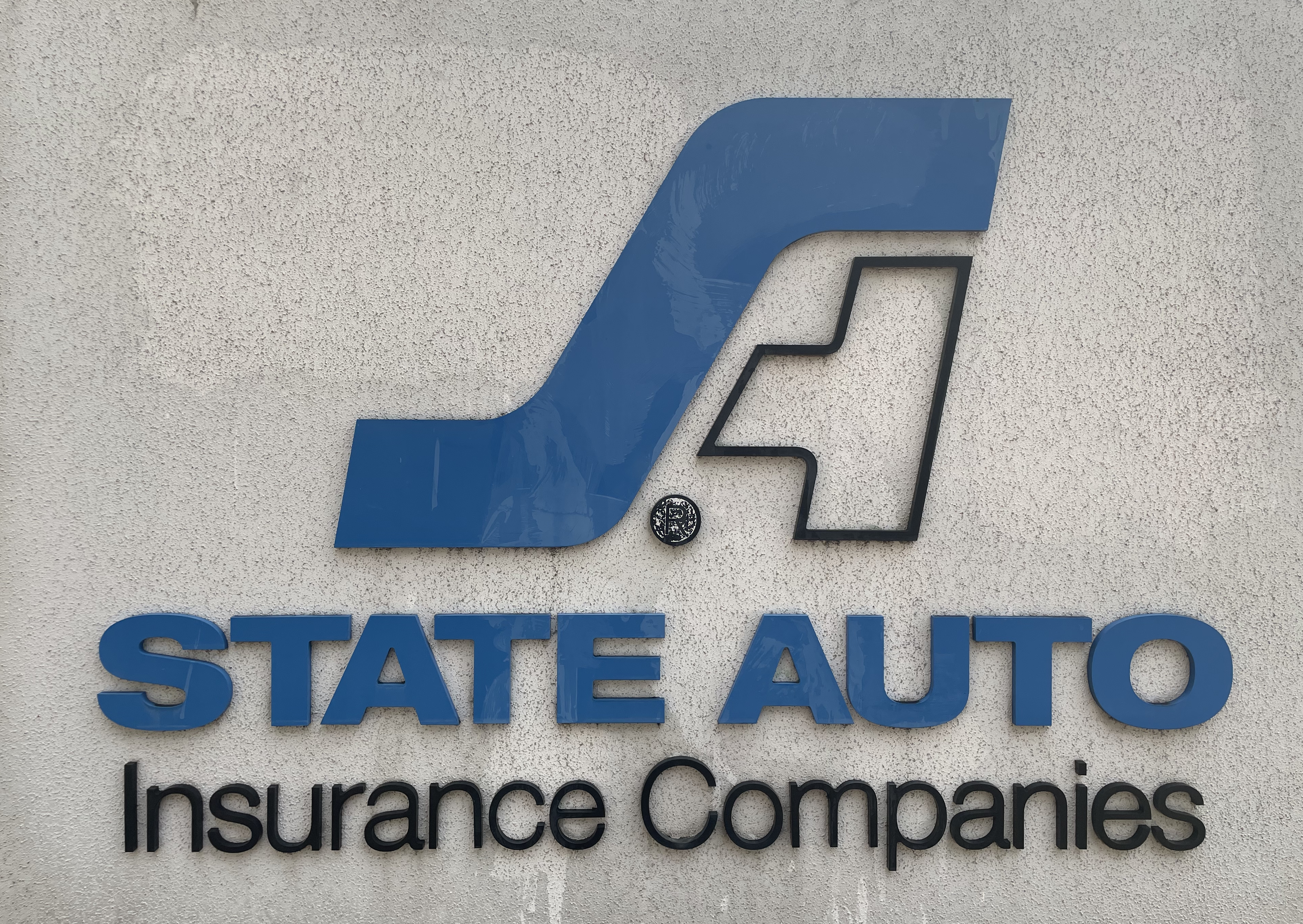
- Type: Public company
- Traded as: NASDAQ, STFC
- Industry: Insurance
- Founded: 16 September 1921
- Founder: Robert Pein
- Headquarters: 518 East Broad Street, Columbus, Ohio
- Owner: Liberty Mutual

State Automobile Mutual Insurance Company, commonly shortened to State Auto Mutual or State Auto, is an American insurance company based in Columbus, Ohio. It was incorporated in 1921 as the first casualty insurance company to be headquartered in Columbus. In 2022, it was acquired by Liberty Mutual for approximately $1 billion.

== History ==
On September 16, 1921, Robert "Bob" Pein founded the State Automobile Mutual Insurance Company with $30,000 of borrowed funds and three employees at 257 East Broad Street. Pein believed that the American automobile insurance market was too dominated by east-coast companies who set rates too high, in addition to employing contractors to serve as claims adjusters rather than employing them full-time. In 1929, the corporation moved to its current site at 518 East Broad Street.

=== Christmas Corner ===
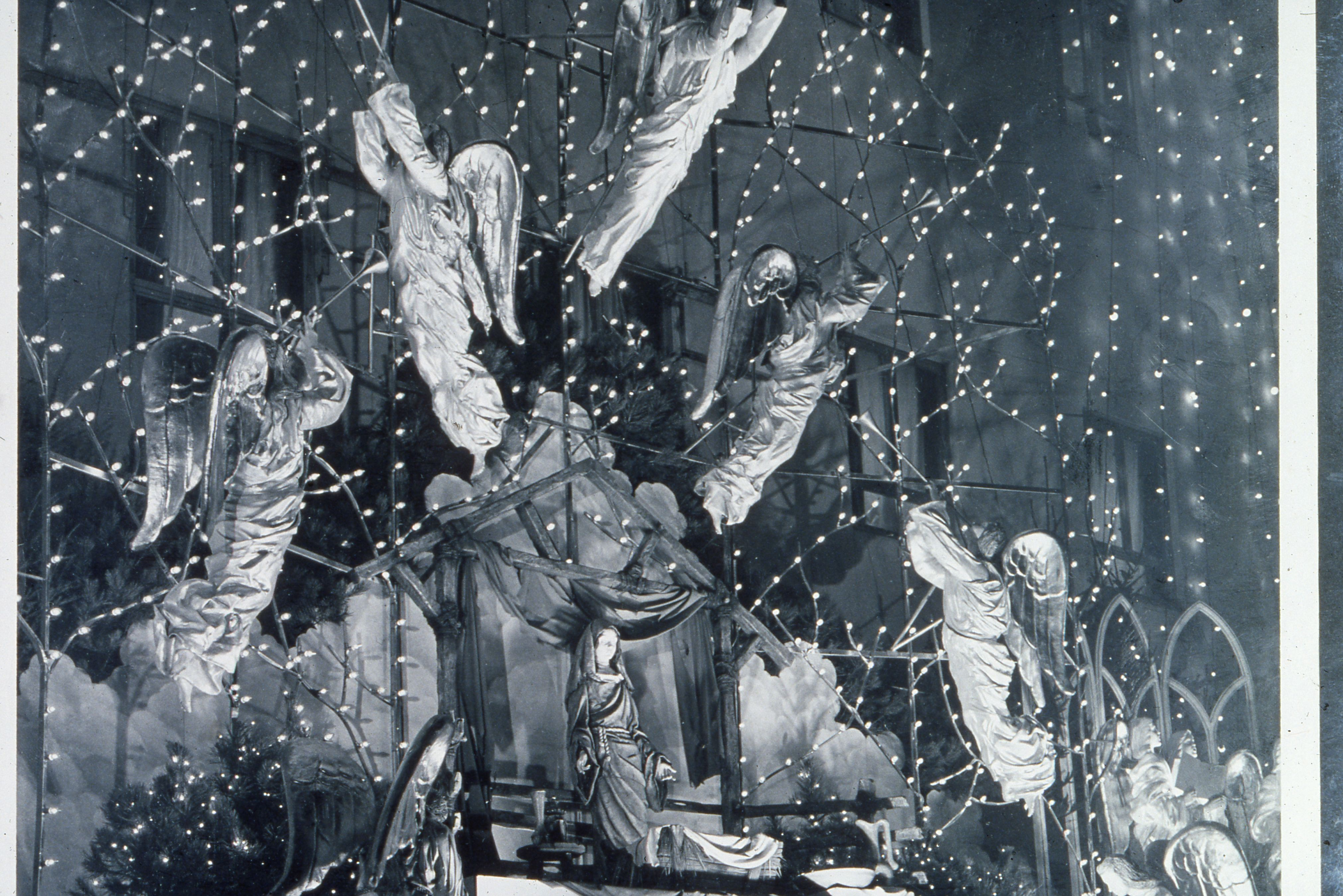
State Auto's Christmas Corner display circa 1935

The first winter after the completion of the current State Auto building, Pein created an elaborate Christmas display so as to boost the spirits of Columbus residents during the Great Depression, what he would later call a "Christmas Card to the community". In 1962, a life-size nativity scene was added to the display, being featured alongside performances from local choirs. The exhibit continued each year, with a 3D camera designed for insurance inspections adding a virtual aspect to the Christmas Corner during the COVID-19 pandemic. The nativity scene was donated to the Museum of Catholic Art and History in August 2023, and its public wintertime display will be moved a few blocks west on Broad Street to the lawn of St. Joseph Cathedral.

== Present ==
Since 1921, State Auto has expanded into serving the property insurance market in addition to the casualty insurance market it was founded to serve. Its stock, traded under the ticker STFC, is on the NASDAQ Global Select Market. Kim Garland was appointed its president following its acquisition by Liberty Mutual in 2022.

== See also ==
- List of United States insurance companies
