= Lamzella =

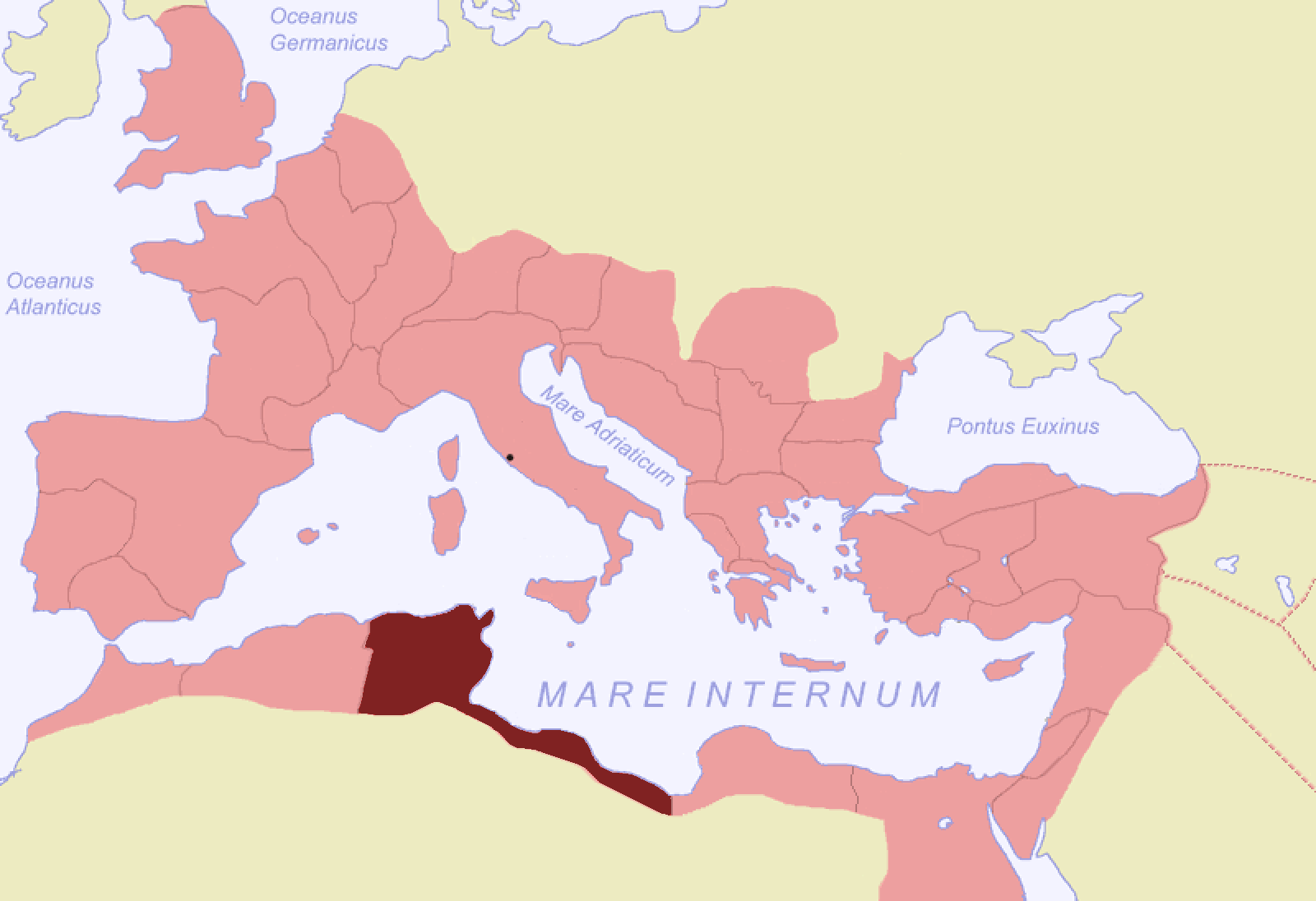
Africa Proconsulare SPQR.

Lamzella was a civitas (town) in the Roman–Berber province of Numidia. It has been tentatively identified with the ruins at Henchir-Resdis in modern Algeria.

Lamzella also served as the seat of the ancient Roman Catholic episcopal see of the same name in the Numidia province.

The Donatist Bishop of Lamzella, Donatian took part in the conference of Carthage of 411, but no Catholic bishops, represented the city for the Catholic Bishop, Rufus, had died recently. In the conference proceedings it is said that "Lamzelli in our positus basilica east Gildo": Morcelli inferred that Gildo was a bishop of Lamzella, Mass deduction questioned by Mesnage and Jaubert.

Today Lamzella survives as titular bishopric, and the current titular bishop is Matthew Elshoff, auxiliary bishop of Los Angeles.

Known bishops:

- Gildo?
- Rufus (? – June 1 411 deceased)
- Donatian (mentioned in 411) (Donatist bishop)
- John Edward Herrmann (March 4, 1966 – June 22, 1973)
- Jean-Marie Compaoré Untaani (17 May 1973 – 15 June 1979)
- Jean-Louis Plouffe (12 December 1986 – 2 December 1989)
- Stephen Edward Blaire (17 February 1990 – 18 January 1999)
- Horacio Ernesto Benites Astoul † (March 16, 1999 – May 25, 2016)
- Thibault Verny (June 25, 2016-2023)
- Matthew Elshoff, from July 18, 2023
