= Frederick F. Campbell =

American Catholic bishop emeritus born 1943

His Excellency, The Most Reverend Frederick Francis Campbell
- Bishop Emeritus of Columbus
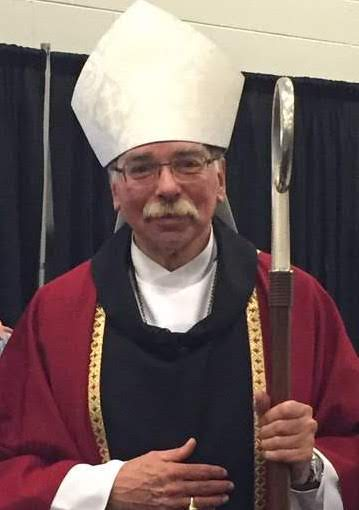
- Bishop Campbell at the 2019; Columbus Catholic Men's Conference
- Church: Roman Catholic Church
- Diocese: Diocese of Columbus
- Appointed: October 14, 2004
- Installed: January 13, 2005
- Retired: March 29, 2019
- Predecessor: James Anthony Griffin
- Successor: Robert J. Brennan
- Previous posts: Auxiliary Bishop of St. Paul and Minneapolis (1999–2005); Titular Bishop of Afufenia (1999–2005); Rector and Vice-President of Saint Paul Seminary (2002–2005)

Orders
- Ordination: May 31, 1980 by John Roach
- Consecration: May 14, 1999 by Harry Joseph Flynn, John Roach, and Joseph Charron

Personal details
- Born: August 5, 1943 (age 83) Elmira, New York, US
- Education: St. Lawrence University; Ohio State University; St. Paul Seminary
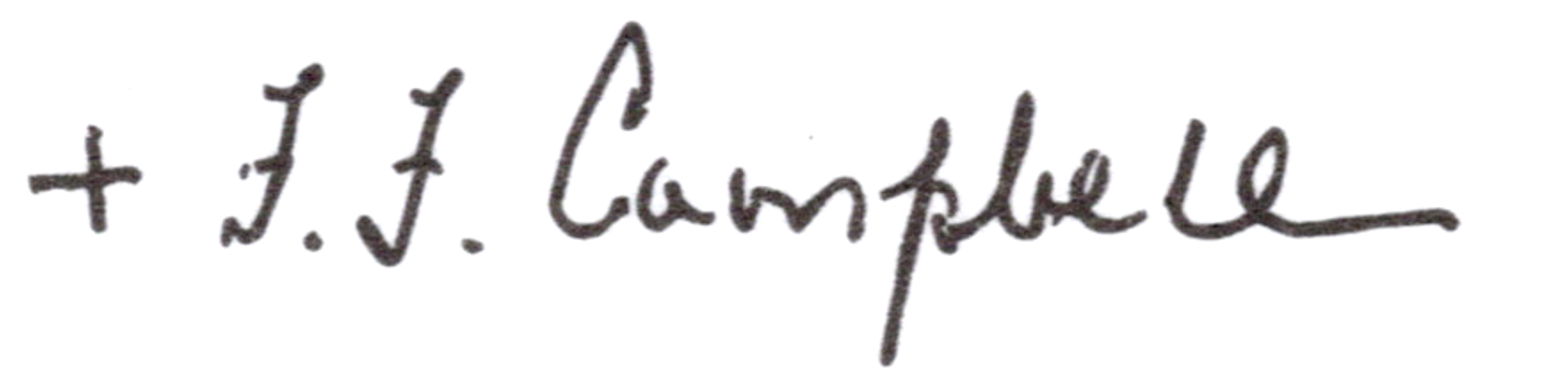
- Signature: Frederick Francis Campbell's signature

Styles of Frederick Francis Campbell
- Reference style: His Excellency; The Most Reverend
- Spoken style: Your Excellency
- Religious style: Bishop

Frederick Francis Campbell (born August 5, 1943) is an American prelate of the Roman Catholic Church. Campbell served as bishop of the Diocese of Columbus in Ohio from 2005 to 2019 and as an auxiliary bishop of the Archdiocese of St. Paul and Minneapolis in Minnesota from 1999 to 2004.

== Biography ==
=== Early life ===
The second of six children, Frederick Campbell was born on August 5, 1943, in Elmira, New York, to Edward and Dorothy Campbell. He studied at St. Lawrence University in Canton, New York, obtaining a Bachelor of Foreign Language degree magna cum laude in 1965. In 1967, Campbell received a master's degree at Ohio State University in Columbus, Ohio, and in 1973 a Doctor of History degree.

From 1967 to 1969, Campbell taught at the Pontifical College Josephinum in Columbus. In 1970, he was appointed an assistant professor of history at California State University, San Bernardino in San Bernardino, California. Campbell decided to pursue the priesthood in 1976, entering Saint Paul Seminary in St. Paul, Minnesota.

=== Priesthood ===
Campbell was ordained to the priesthood for the Archdiocese of St. Paul and Minneapolis by Archbishop John Roach on May 31, 1980.

After his ordination, Campbell served as an associate pastor at St. Charles Borromeo Parish in St. Anthony, Minnesota, until 1987, and then as pastor of St. John the Evangelist Parish in Hopkins, Minnesota, from 1987 to 1994. From 1991 to 1994, Campbell was also canonical administrator of John Ireland Catholic School in Hopkins. He then served as pastor of St. Joseph Parish in West St. Paul, Minnesota until 1999.

=== Auxiliary Bishop of St. Paul and Minneapolis ===
On March 2, 1999, Pope John Paul II appointed Campbell as an auxiliary bishop of the Archdiocese of St. Paul and Minneapolis and titular bishop of Afufenia. He was installed and consecrated on May 14, 1999, by Archbishop Harry Flynn, with Roach and Bishop Joseph Carron serving as co-consecrators, at the Cathedral of St. Paul in St. Paul, Minnesota.

In July 2002, Campbell became rector and vice-president of Saint Paul Seminary. He served on the seminary's board of trustees and as a board member for St. Thomas Academy in Mendota Heights, Minnesota and St. Bernard School in St. Paul. Campbell also served on the archdiocesan Bio-Medical Ethics Commission and worked with the Office of Marriage and Family Life, the Respect Life Program, and the Office for the Permanent Diaconate.

=== Bishop of Columbus ===
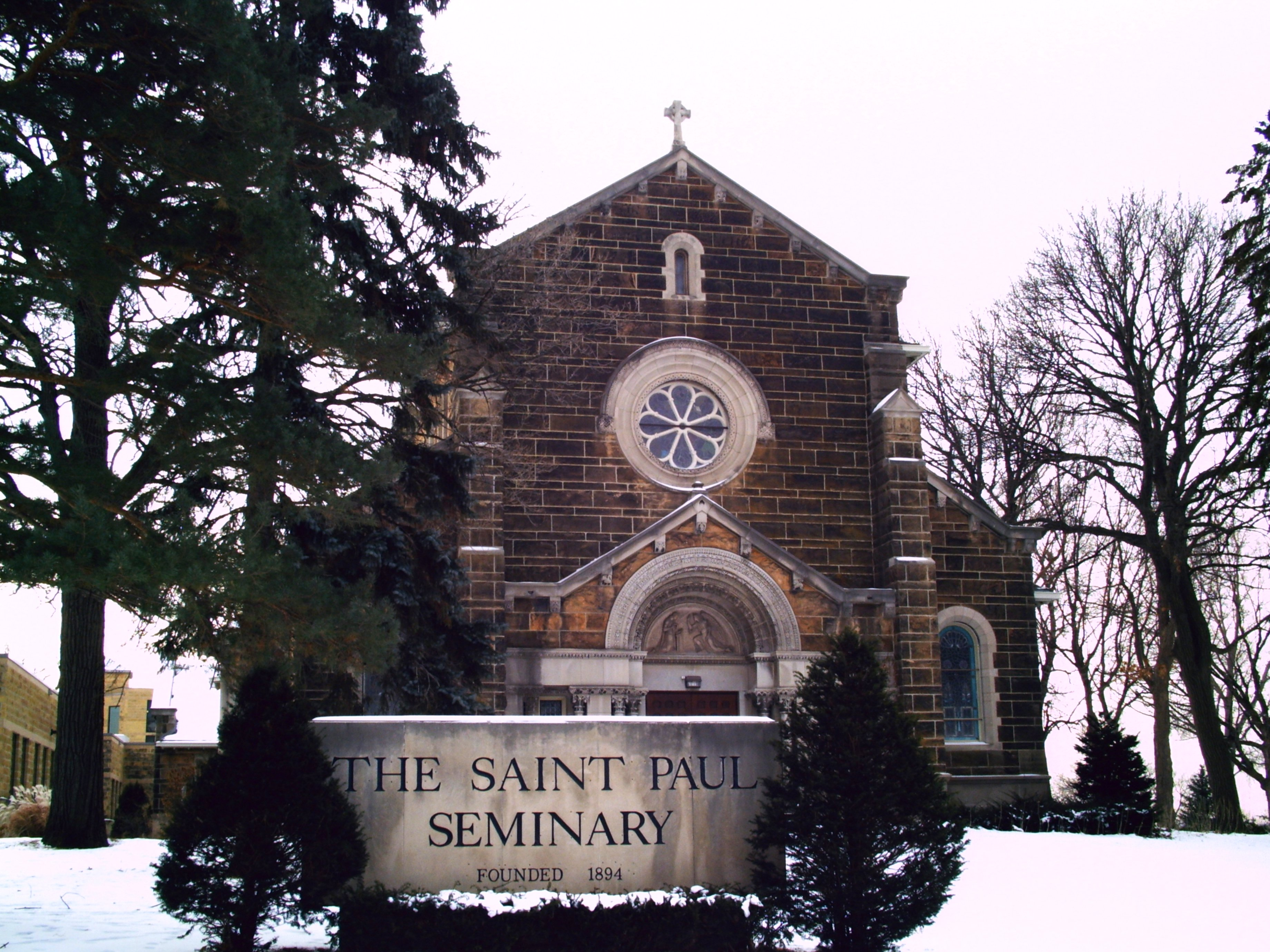
Saint Paul Seminary, St. Paul, Minnesota (2007

On October 14, 2004. John Paul II appointed Campbell as the eleventh bishop of the Diocese of Columbus. He was installed on January 13, 2005, by Archbishop Daniel Pilarczyk.

In 2005, Campbell proposed the establishment of a civil registry of priests from the diocese who had been "credibly accused" of sexual abuse. Campbell testified in 2006 against a proposed law in the Ohio General Assembly that would have allowed a 20-year statute of limitations for sexual abuse cases. In his testimony to the legislature, Campbell claimed that the 20-year for prosecution window wasn't fair and would curtail the church's charitable work. In the end, the Assembly passed the legislation with a 10-year window.

In May 2007, Campbell suffered a minor heart attack. On March 30, 2009, doctors amputated his left leg below the knee after diagnosing him with squamous cell carcinoma. He also had osteomyelitis in multiple bones in his foot, and an open wound that would not readily heal.

On August 17, 2018, Campbell and the diocese were named in a $2 million lawsuit by Kevin Heidtman, a former student at St. Charles Preparatory School in Columbus. Heidtman alleged that he was sexually molested on at least six separate occasions at the school by Monsignor Thomas Bennett between 2002 and 2003. Bennett died in 2008. The lawsuit alleged that the defendants, including Campbell, became aware of Bennett's alleged molestation of the student, but failed to take any action. After Heidtman filed suit, two other students came forward with accusations again Bennett. The diocese settled the lawsuit with Heidtman in 2020 for $1 million.

=== Retirement and legacy ===
Pope Francis accepted Campbell's letter of resignation as bishop of Columbus on January 31, 2019. Campbell was subsequently appointed apostolic administrator for the diocese and remained in that role until the installation of Bishop Robert J. Brennan as his replacement on March 29, 2019. As of 2022, Campbell was still serving in the diocese and as a professor at the Pontifical College Josephinum, teaching primarily history.

Catholic Church titles
Preceded by James Anthony Griffin	Bishop of Columbus; 2005-2019	Succeeded by Robert J. Brennan
Preceded by -	Auxiliary Bishop of St. Paul and Minneapolis; 1999-2005	Succeeded by -
