= James Anthony Griffin =

Catholic bishop (born 1934)

His Excellency, The Most Reverend James Anthony Griffin
- Bishop Emeritus of Columbus
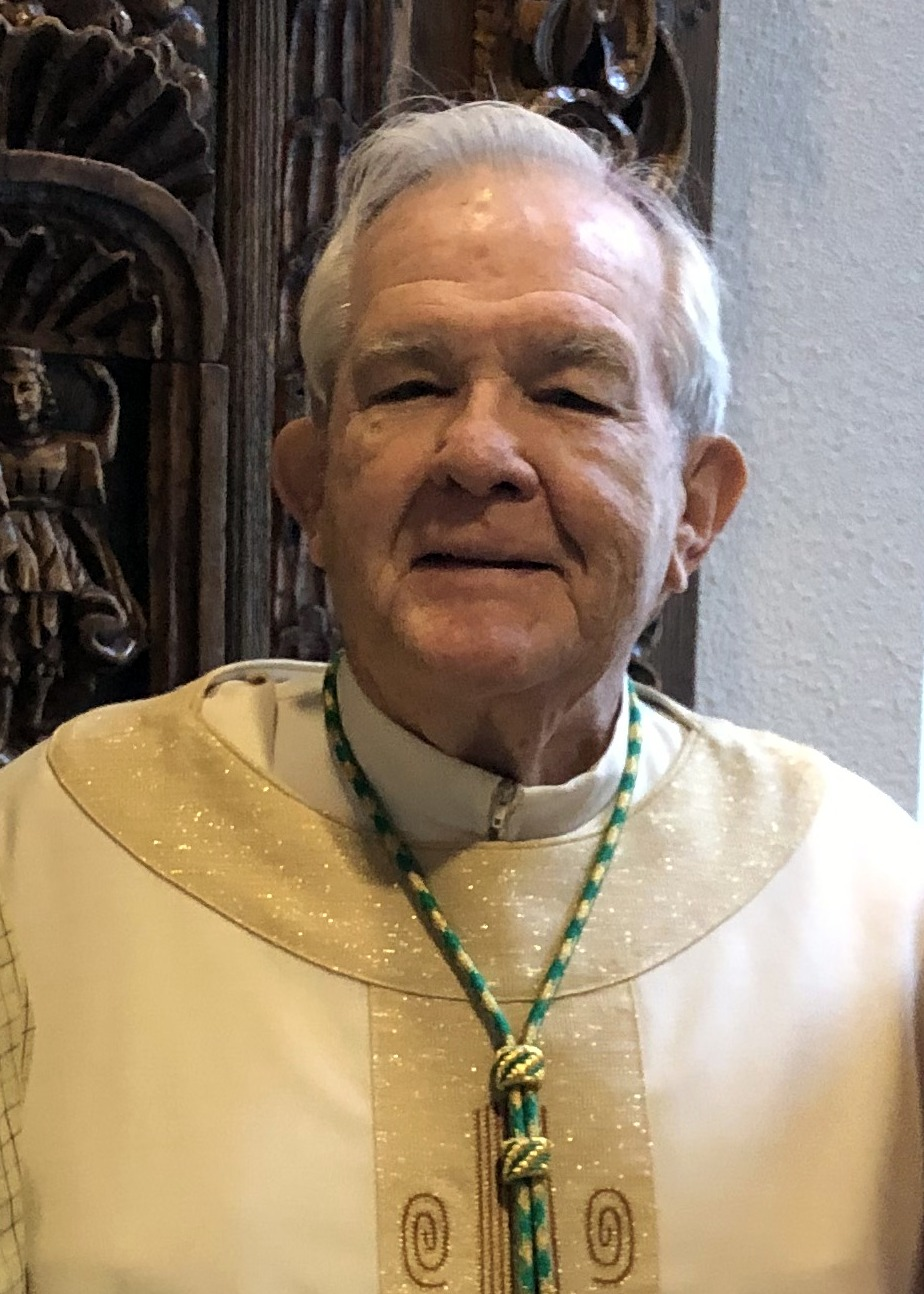
- Bishop Griffin in Dublin in 2019
- Church: Roman Catholic Church
- Diocese: Columbus
- Appointed: February 4, 1983
- Installed: April 25, 1983
- Retired: October 14, 2004
- Predecessor: Edward John Herrmann
- Successor: Frederick F. Campbell
- Previous post: Auxiliary Bishop of Cleveland and Titular Bishop of Hólar (1979–1983)

Orders
- Ordination: May 28, 1960 by John Krol
- Consecration: August 1, 1979 by James Aloysius Hickey, Clarence George Issenmann, and Joseph Abel Francis

Personal details
- Born: June 13, 1934 (age 92) Fairview Park, Ohio
- Education: St. Charles College; Borromeo College; St. Mary Seminary; Pontifical Lateran University; Cleveland State University
- Motto: Radicati in ipso (Rooted in Him)
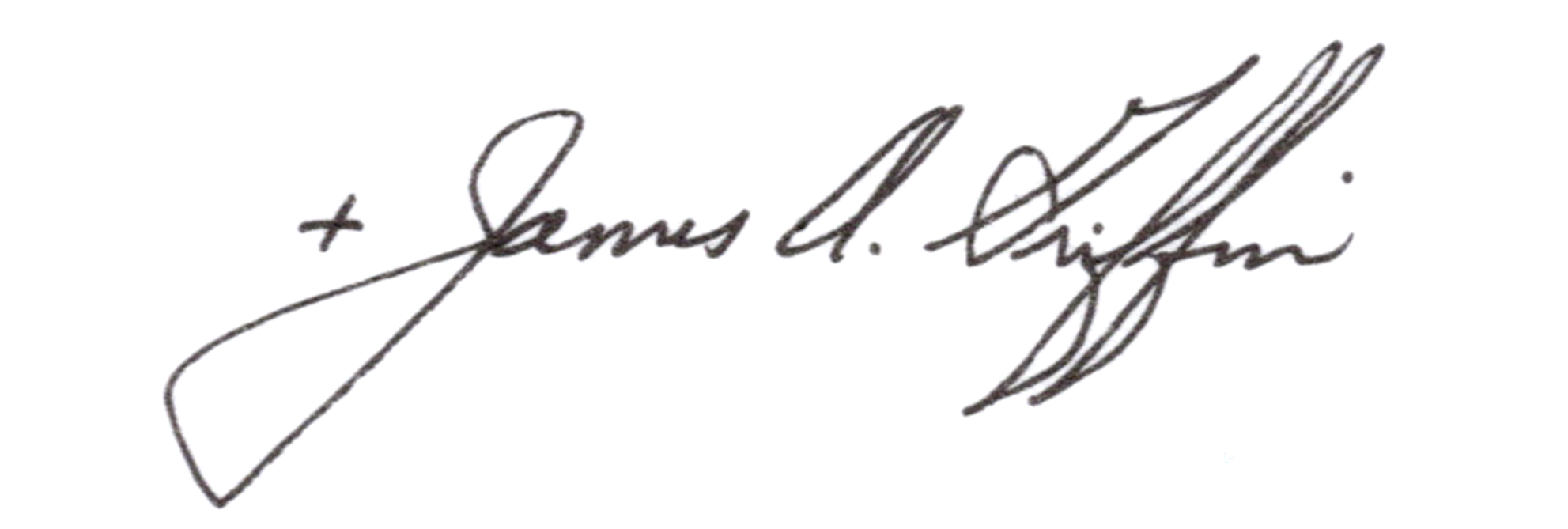
- Signature: James Anthony Griffin's signature

Styles of James Anthony Griffin
- Reference style: His Excellency; The Most Reverend
- Spoken style: Your Excellency
- Religious style: Bishop

James Anthony Griffin (born June 13, 1934) is an American prelate of the Roman Catholic Church. Griffin served as bishop of the Diocese of Columbus in Ohio from 1983 to 2004. He previously served as an auxiliary bishop of the Diocese of Cleveland in Ohio from 1979 to 1983.

== Biography ==
The fifth of seven children, Griffin was born in Fairview Park, Ohio, on June 13, 1934, to Thomas Griffin and Margaret Hanousek. He attended St. Angela Merici School in Fairview Park, Ohio, and Saint Ignatius High School in Cleveland.

After high school, Griffin went to St. Charles College in Catonsville, Maryland. He finished his undergraduate studies at Borromeo College in Wickliffe, Ohio, receiving his Bachelor of Philosophy degree. Griffin then attended St. Mary Seminary in Cleveland.

=== Ministry ===
On May 28, 1960, Bishop John Krol ordained Griffin to the priesthood for the Diocese of Cleveland in the Cathedral of St. John the Evangelist in Cleveland. After his ordination, Griffin was assigned as associate pastor at St. Jerome Parish in Cleveland. In 1961, Griffin was posted to Rome to study at the Pontifical Lateran University. In 1963, he received his Licentiate of Canon Law magna cum laude from Lateran University.

After returning to Cleveland in 1963, Griffin served as secretary-notary of the Marriage Court of the diocese. In 1965, he was appointed associate chancellor and vice chancellor. During that time, he attended night classes at Cleveland State University, receiving his Doctorate in Civil Law summa cum laude in 1972. Griffin then passed the Ohio Bar Exam. In 1973, Griffin was appointed chancellor of the diocese.

In January 1978, Bishop James Hickey named Griffin as vicar general and administrator pro tem of the Cathedral of St. John the Evangelist Parish. In April 1978, he was appointed pastor of St. William Parish in Euclid, Ohio.

=== Auxiliary Bishop of Cleveland ===
On June 30, 1979, Pope John Paul II appointed Griffin as an auxiliary bishop of Cleveland and titular bishop of Hólar. He was consecrated in Cleveland by Hickey on August 1, 1979.

=== Bishop of Columbus ===
On February 7, 1983, John Paul II appointed Griffin as the tenth bishop of Columbus. He was installed on April 25, 1983.

In 1985, Griffin established the Foundation of the Catholic Diocese of Columbus and initiated the Legacy of Catholic Learning campaign in 1989 and Challenge In Changing Times campaign. He also established "Breaking The Silence" task force to reduce family violence. Griffin also served on a number of committees of the United States Conference of Catholic Bishops and was president of Catholic Relief Services (1991–1995).

In 1993, Griffin removed Reverend Phillip Jacobs from his parish due to allegations that he had sexually abused a teenage boy. The boy's family requested that the police not be notified, but years later Griffin made the notification. When the Diocese of Victoria in British Columbia was considering hiring Jacobs, Griffin informed them about the allegations against him. The Diocese of Victoria hired Jacobs anyway. In 2019, Jacobs was arrested in Victoria, British Columbia for sexual abuse of minors.

== Retirement ==
On October 14, 2004, Griffin sent his letter of resignation as bishop of Columbus to John Paul II, citing his arthritis. He was succeeded by Bishop Frederick F. Campbell. In retirement, Griffin served as a professor of theology at Ohio Dominican University and weekend associate at St. Joan of Arc parish in Powell, Ohio, where he rents a condo. As of 2022, Griffin still filled in occasionally for parishes in need of a priest and attended diocesan clergy gatherings.

== See also ==
- Catholic Church hierarchy
- Catholic Church in the United States
- Historical list of the Catholic bishops of the United States
- List of Catholic bishops of the United States
- Lists of patriarchs, archbishops, and bishops

Catholic Church titles
Preceded by Edward John Herrmann	Bishop of Columbus; 1983–2004	Succeeded by Frederick F. Campbell
Preceded by -	Auxiliary Bishop of Cleveland; 1979–1983	Succeeded by -
