= John Michael McNamara =

American clergyman

His Excellency, The Most Reverend John Michael McNamara
- Auxiliary Bishop of Washington
- Bishop McNamara
- In office: 1947-1960
- Other posts: Titular Bishop of Eumenia (1927-1960); Auxiliary Bishop of Baltimore (1927-1947)

Orders
- Ordination: June 21, 1902 by Cardinal James Gibbons
- Consecration: March 29, 1928 by Archbishop Michael Joseph Curley

Personal details
- Born: August 12, 1878 Baltimore, Maryland, U.S.
- Died: November 26, 1960 (aged 82) Washington, D.C. US
- Denomination: Roman Catholic
- Parents: Michael and Margaret (née McNeally) McNamara
- Education: St. Mary's Seminary; Loyola College Maryland

John Michael McNamara (August 12, 1878 – November 26, 1960) was an American prelate of the Roman Catholic Church. He served as an auxiliary bishop of the Archdiocese of Baltimore in Maryland from 1927 to 1947 and of the Archdiocese of Washington in the District of Columbia from 1947 until his death in 1960.

== Biography ==
=== Early life ===
John McNamara was born on August 12, 1878, in Baltimore, Maryland, to Michael and Margaret (née McNeally) McNamara. He studied at Loyola College and at St. Mary's Seminary, both in Baltimore.

=== Priesthood ===
McNamara was ordained to the priesthood for the Archdiocese of Baltimore by Cardinal James Gibbons on June 21, 1902. He then did pastoral work in the archdiocese and in the Diocese of Wilmington. McNamara was the founding pastor of St. Gabriel Parish in Washington, D.C. in 1919.

==== Auxiliary Bishop of Baltimore ====
On December 16, 1927, McNamara was appointed as an auxiliary bishop of Baltimore and titular bishop of Eumenia by Pope Pius XI. He received his episcopal consecration on March 29, 1928, from Archbishop Michael Joseph Curley, with Bishops William Joseph Hafey and Thomas Joseph Toolen serving as co-consecrators, at the Cathedral of the Assumption in Baltimore.

McNamara served as vicar general of the archdiocese, and was named an assistant at the pontifical throne by the Vatican on March 30, 1947.

=== Auxiliary Bishop of Washington ===
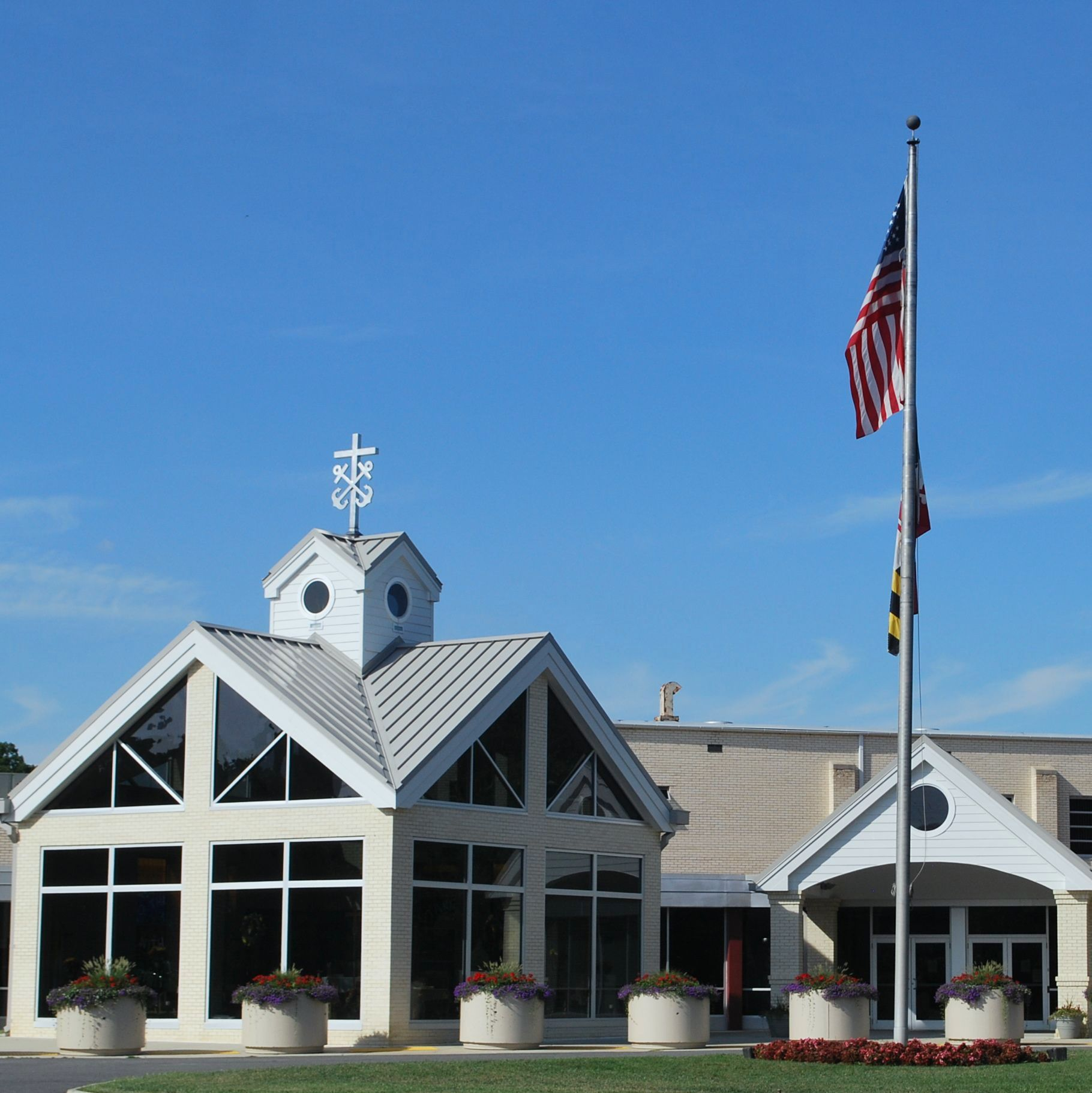
Bishop McNamara High School, Forestville, Maryland (2011)

On November 15, 1947, McNamara was appointed as an auxiliary bishop of the newly erected Archdiocese of Washington by Pope Pius XII. He assumed the role of vicar general in Washington as well.

Throughout his ecclesiastical career, he actively supported the canonization of Mother Elizabeth Ann Seton, and ordained nearly 2,000 men to the priesthood.

=== Death and legacy ===
McNamara continued to serve as an auxiliary bishop until his death in Washington on November 26, 1960 at age 82.Bishop McNamara High School in Forestville, Maryland, bears his name.

== See also ==
Catholic Church titles
Preceded by –	Auxiliary Bishop of Washington; 1947–1960	Succeeded by –
Preceded by –	Auxiliary Bishop of Baltimore; 1927–1947	Succeeded by –
