= Schwaltenweiher =

Reservoir in germany

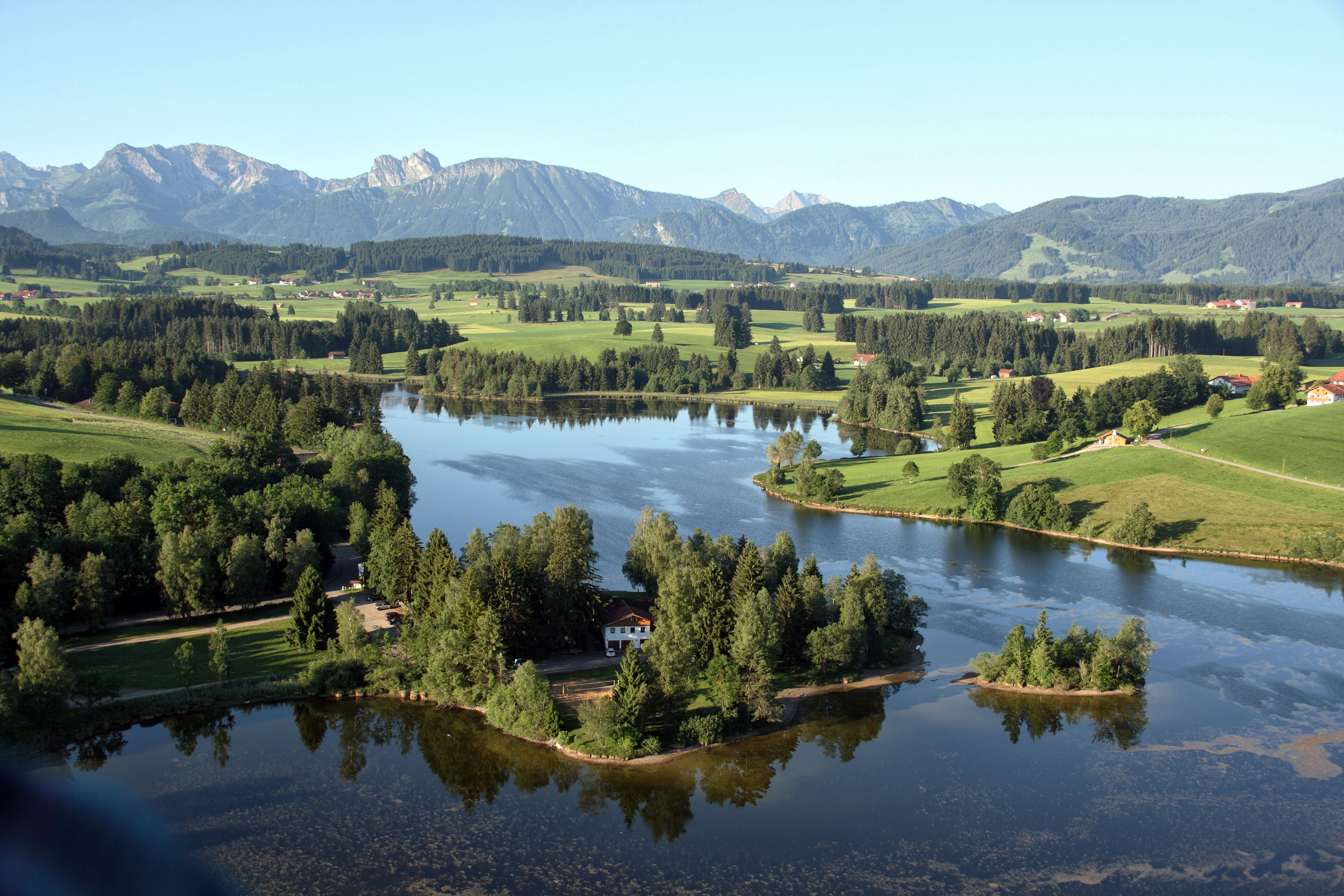

- Location within Germany
- Location: Ostallgäu, Bavaria, Germany
- Coordinates: 47°39′02″N 10°34′31″E
- Type: Reservoir

The Schwaltenweiher is a reservoir in the Ostallgäu foothills of the Alps in Bavaria, Germany. It lies 14 km (8.7 mi) from the Allgäu Alps between the towns of Seeg and Rückholz. It was named after the Schwaltenmühle mill built beside it, which was in turn named after the Schwalt or Schwald family. It is now used for bathing and fishing.

== History ==
Maximilian I, Holy Roman Emperor set aside the lake in 1514 for fishing and hunting waterfowl. His neighbouring Schloss Falkenberg (at what is now Goldhasen am Westufer) was destroyed by Imperial troops during the Thirty Years' War to prevent it falling into Swedish hands. The lake has passed through several owners over the following centuries, and is still in private hands. Notable guests there have been Theodor Heuss, Horst Köhler and Theo Waigel.
