= Kirnach =

Kirnach may refer to:

- Kirnach (Brigach), a river of Baden-Württemberg, Germany, tributary of the Brigach
- Kirnach (Wertach), a river of Bavaria, Germany, tributary of the Wertach
