= Riederloh =

Forced labor camps in Nazi Germany

Coordinates: 47.9016°N 10.6497°E

Riederloh was the name of two camps providing forced laborers to the gunpowder and ammunition facility of Dynamit AG (DAG) in Kaufbeuren, Bavaria. Located approximately 80 km to the southwest of Munich in Nazi Germany, the camps were named "Riederloh" and "Riederloh II" respectively.

== Riederloh ==
"Riederloh" was a residence camp directly run by the DAG. It existed from 1939 to 1945 at the south end of the DAG site. The camp hosted German laborers during construction (1939–1941), as well as German and non-German forced laborers, mainly from Poland and the USSR, as well as Italian military detainees (1941–1945).

== Riederloh II ==
"Riederloh II" was a sub-camp of Dachau concentration camp and, therefore, run by the SS. It existed from 1944 to 1945 at approximately 2 km to the east of the DAG site. Camp Riederloh II was a work camp where 472 to among approximately 1,000 Jewish inmates (mainly from Poland and Hungary), brought to Kaufbeuren from Auschwitz after having passed selection, died by malnutrition and physical infirmity, as well as extremely brutal behaviour of SS guards, between fall 1944 and January 1945. The surviving inmates were marched to Dachau in 1945, put under quarantine, fed to make them fit for labor again, and then taken to other sub-camps of Dachau. Meanwhile, the barracks of Riederloh II were reassigned to Ukrainian forced laborers.

== After 1945 ==
On the sites of the DAG facilities and the Riederloh camp, after 1946, the German nationals (often referred to as Sudeten Germans) expelled from Jablonec in Czechoslovakia were settled; their settlement grew into a large quarter of Kaufbeuren and was named Neugablonz later. Other Czech Germans were settled on and around the site of Riederloh II, their (smaller) settlement evolving into what is today Steinholz, a detached settlement of the village of Mauerstetten. Therefore, sometimes Riederloh II is referred to with the unofficial name of concentration camp Maurstetten-Steinholz.

== Memorials ==
At Maurstetten there is a cemetery with a memorial stone recalling the death of the 472 Jewish victims at Riederloh II. Victims of labor accidents of the barracks of camp Riederloh are remembered on a memorial stone in the Roman Catholic Church in Neugablonz. Mentally ill laborers of camp Riederloh, or people suffering from nervous breakdowns, were brought to the nearby facility at Kaufbeuren-Irsee if they wouldn't recover within 4 weeks time.

== Bibliography ==
- Römer, Gernot (2009). Encyclopedia of camps and ghettos, 1933 - 1945 / 1,A: Early camps, youth camps, and concentration camps and subcamps under the SS-Business Administration Main Office (WVHA), page 536–538. Bloomington: Indiana Univ. Press. ISBN 978-0-253-35328-3.
