= Wald (Allgäu) =

- Municipality
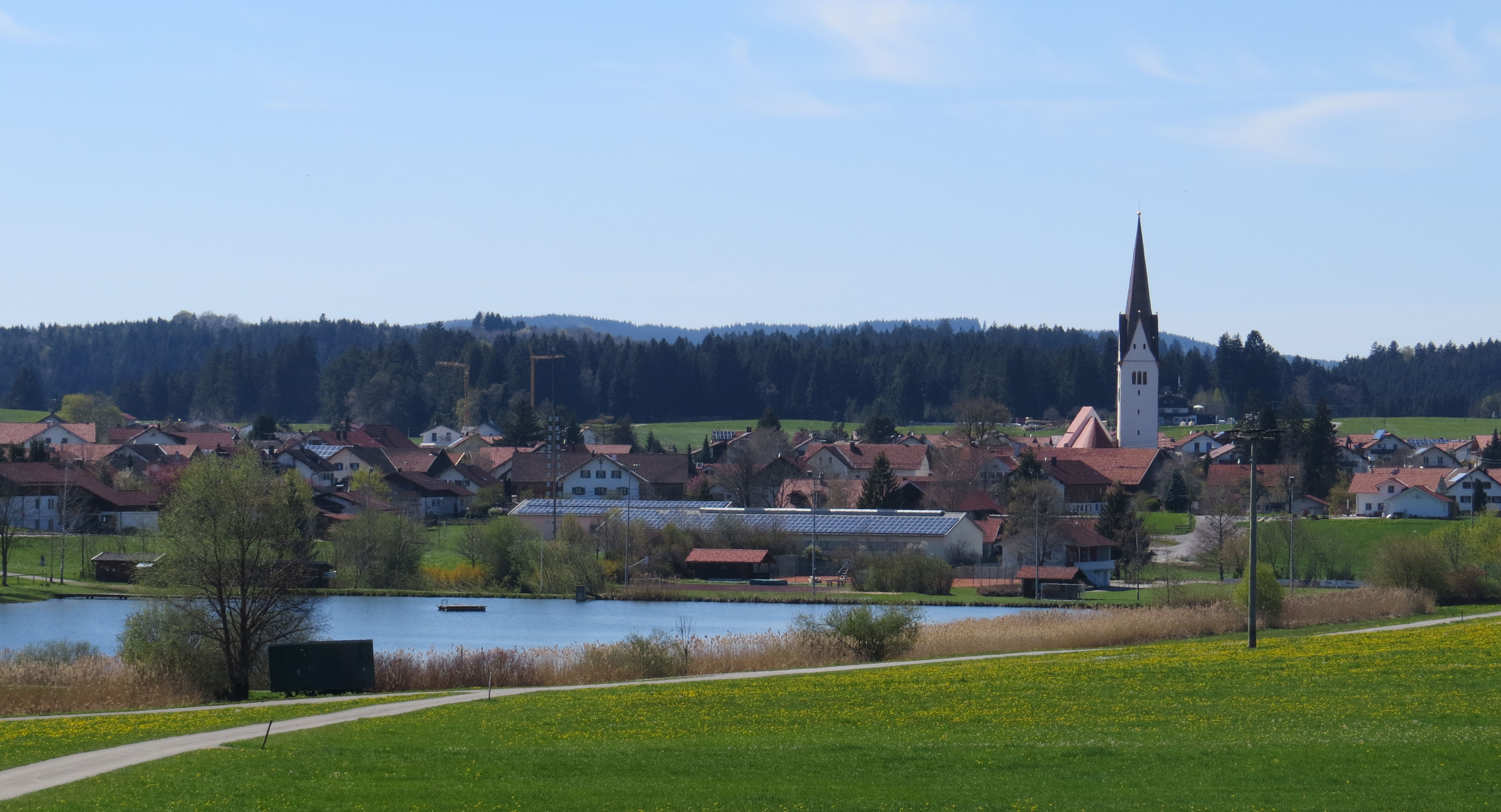
- General view of Wald

- Coat of arms

- Location of Wald within Ostallgäu district
- Interactive map of Wald
- Location within Germany Location within Bavaria
- Coordinates: 47°43′N 10°33′E
- Country: Germany
- State: Bavaria
- Admin. region: Schwaben
- District: Ostallgäu
- Municipal assoc.: Seeg

Government
  - Mayor (2020–26): Johanna Purschke

Area
  - Total: 17.97 km^{2} (6.94 sq mi)
- Elevation: 800 m (2,600 ft)

Population (2025-12-31)
  - Total: 1,163
  - Density: 64.72/km^{2} (167.6/sq mi)
- Time zone: UTC+01:00 (CET)
  - Summer (DST): UTC+02:00 (CEST)
- Postal codes: 87616
- Dialling codes: 09463
- Vehicle registration: OAL
- Website: www.wald-allgaeu.de

Wald (German pronunciation: [valt]) is a municipality in the district of Ostallgäu in Bavaria in Germany.

The village Wald is located in the Allgäu region. The municipality of Wald belongs to the administrative community Seeg and is located in the administrative district of Bavarian Swabia.

The state-recognized recreational resort Wald includes many surrounding hamlets: Barnstein, Bergers, Birngschwend, Geigers, Gemmels, houses, Herring, Hofen, Holzmanns, Kaltenbrunn, Kaufmanns, Kippach, Klosterhof, Neupolz, Öbele, Ofen, Stechele, Wetzlers, Wies, Wimberg.

== Sights ==
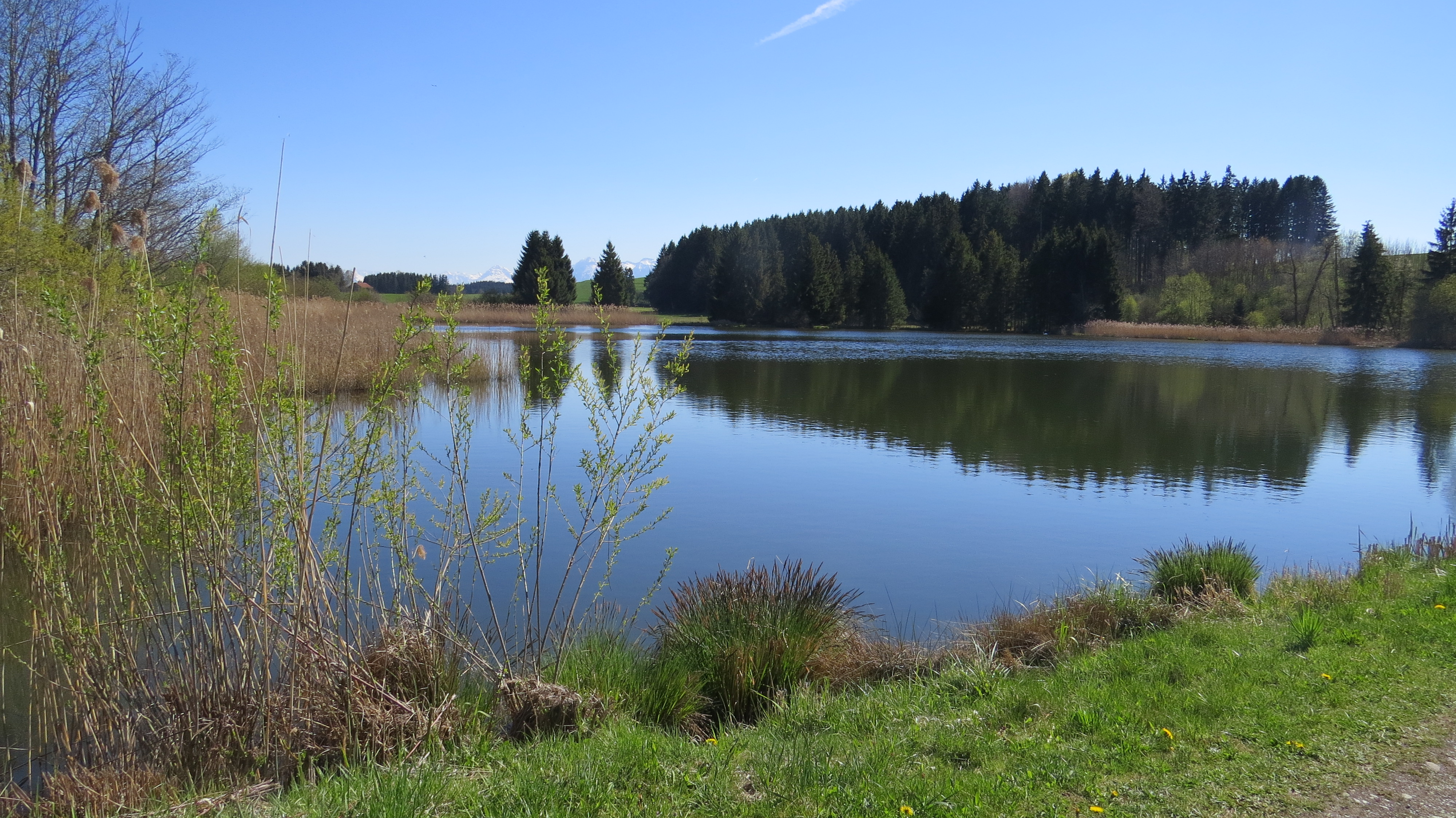
Weiher (ponds) of Wald

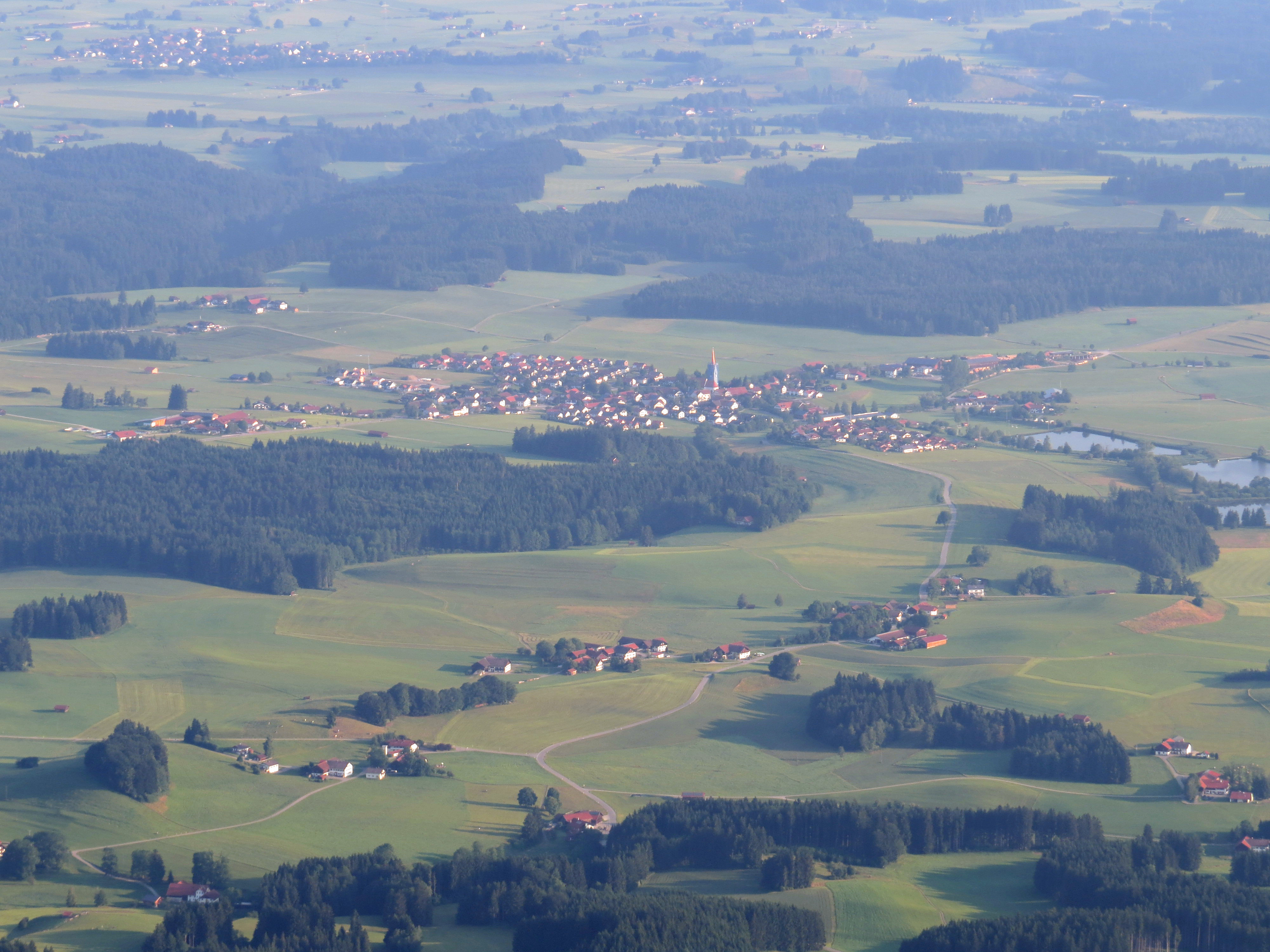
Wald from the air from the southeast

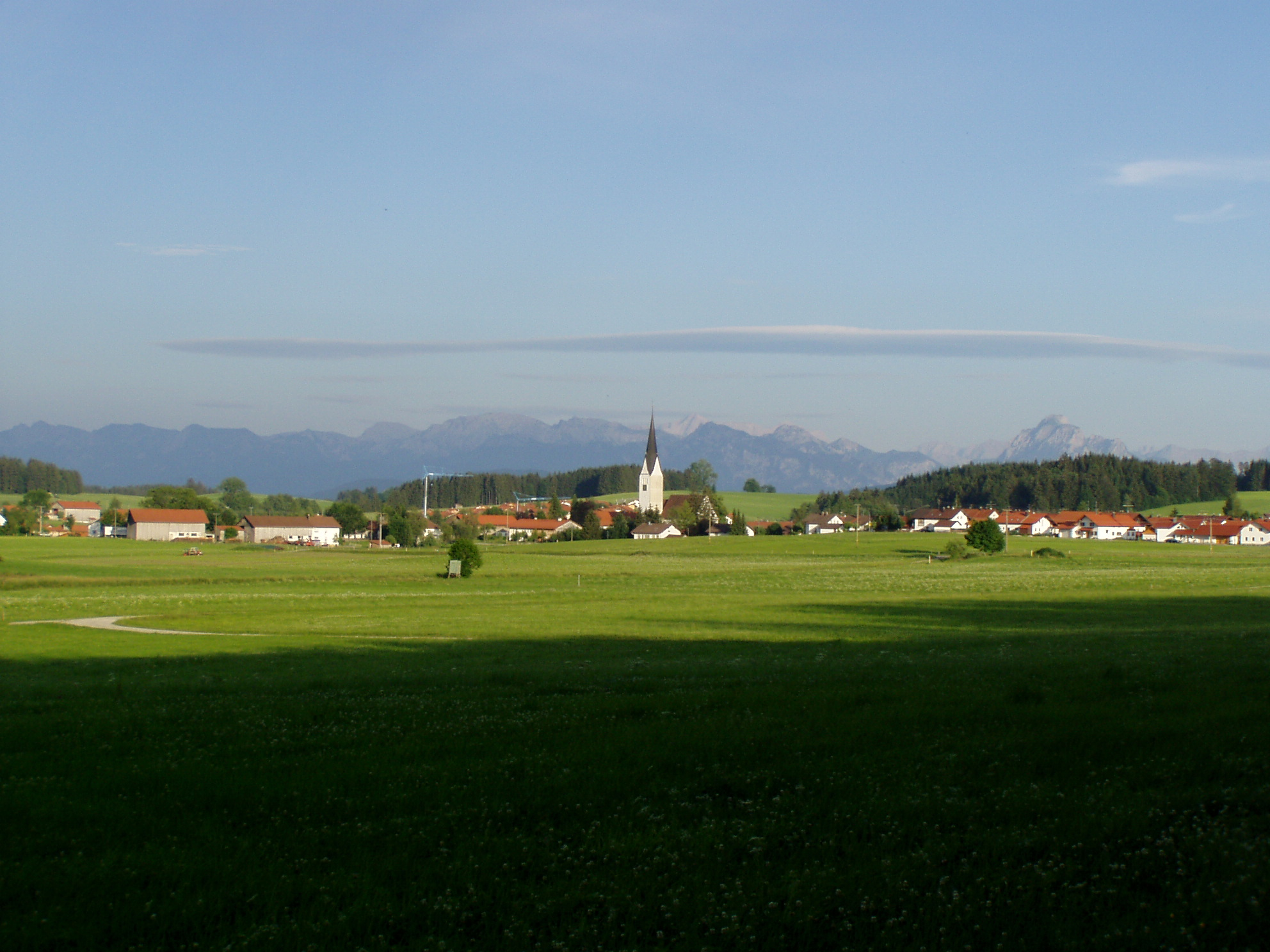
Wald from northwest

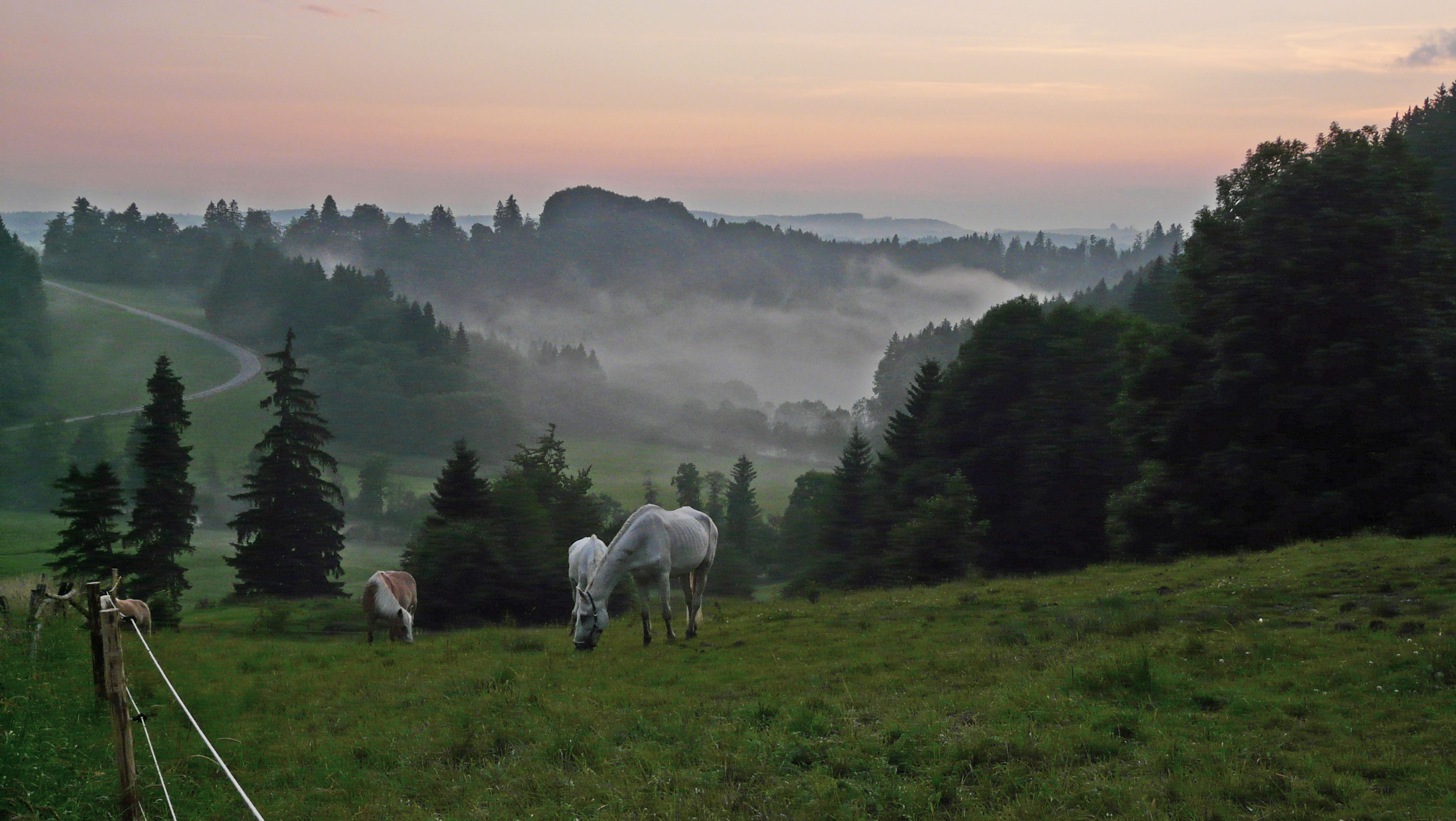
Wertachschlucht near Wald

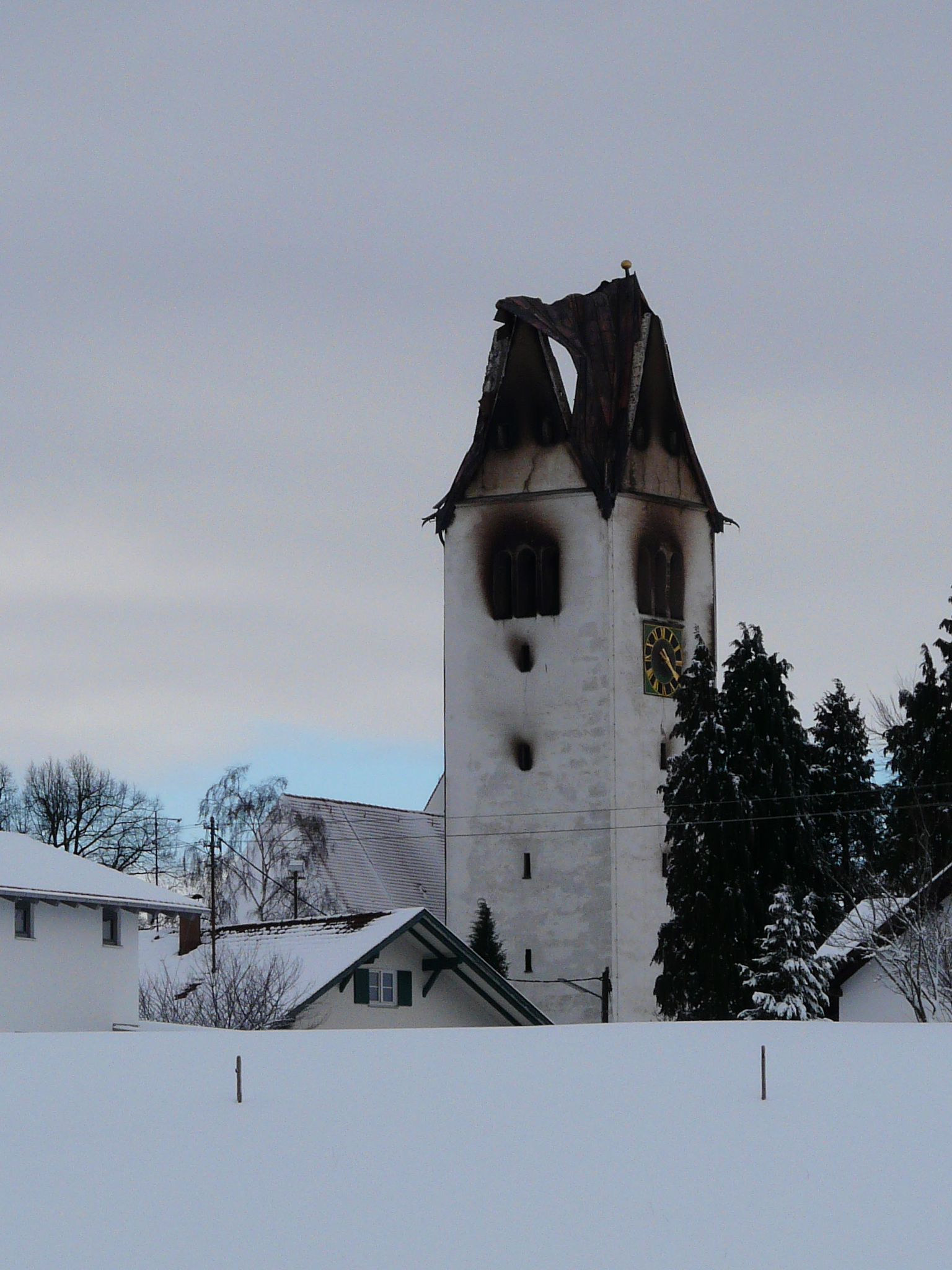
Wald - Church tower after fire, January 2012

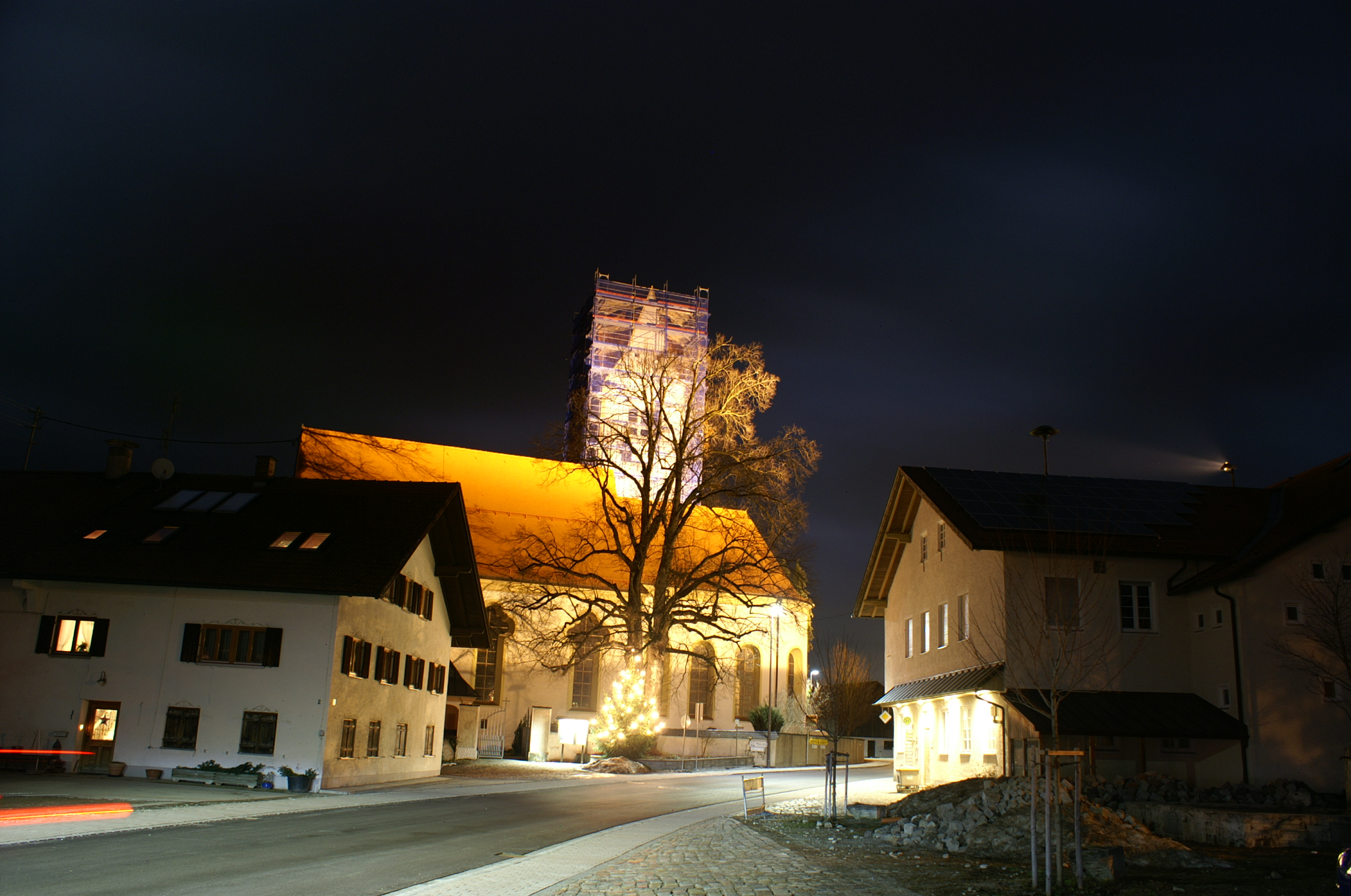
Wald at night, December 2012
