= Roßhaupten =

- Municipality
- Coat of arms

- Location of Roßhaupten within Ostallgäu district
- Interactive map of Roßhaupten
- Location within Germany Location within Bavaria
- Coordinates: 47°39′N 10°43′E
- Country: Germany
- State: Bavaria
- Admin. region: Schwaben
- District: Ostallgäu
- Municipal assoc.: Roßhaupten

Government
  - Mayor (2020–26): Thomas Pihusch

Area
  - Total: 39.10 km^{2} (15.10 sq mi)
- Elevation: 816 m (2,677 ft)

Population (2025-12-31)
  - Total: 2,239
  - Density: 57.26/km^{2} (148.3/sq mi)
- Time zone: UTC+01:00 (CET)
  - Summer (DST): UTC+02:00 (CEST)
- Postal codes: 87672
- Dialling codes: 08367
- Vehicle registration: OAL
- Website: www.rosshaupten.de

Roßhaupten is a municipality in the district of Ostallgäu in Bavaria in Germany.
