= Germaringen =

- Municipality
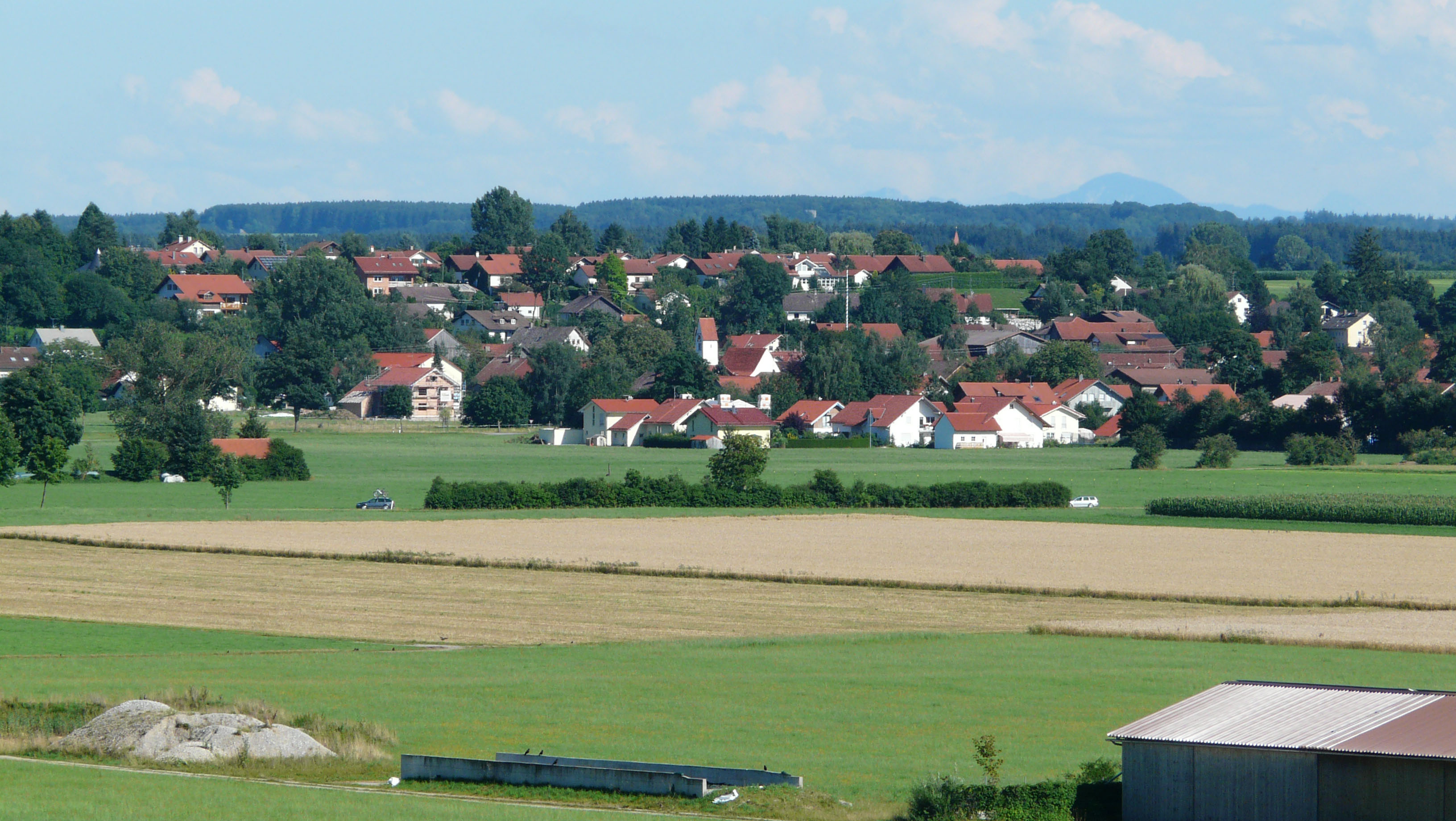
- Untergermaringen

- Coat of arms

- Location of Germaringen within Ostallgäu district
- Interactive map of Germaringen
- Location within Germany Location within Bavaria
- Coordinates: 47°56′N 10°40′E
- Country: Germany
- State: Bavaria
- Admin. region: Schwaben
- District: Ostallgäu

Government
  - Mayor (2022–28): Helmut Bucher (FW)

Area
  - Total: 22.88 km^{2} (8.83 sq mi)
- Elevation: 654–718 m (2,146–2,356 ft)

Population (2025-12-31)
  - Total: 3,884
  - Density: 169.8/km^{2} (439.7/sq mi)
- Time zone: UTC+01:00 (CET)
  - Summer (DST): UTC+02:00 (CEST)
- Postal codes: 87656
- Dialling codes: 08341
- Vehicle registration: OAL
- Website: www.germaringen.de

Germaringen (German pronunciation: [ˈɡɛʁmaʁɪŋən]) is a municipality in the district of Ostallgäu in Bavaria in Germany.
