= Lengenwang =

- Municipality
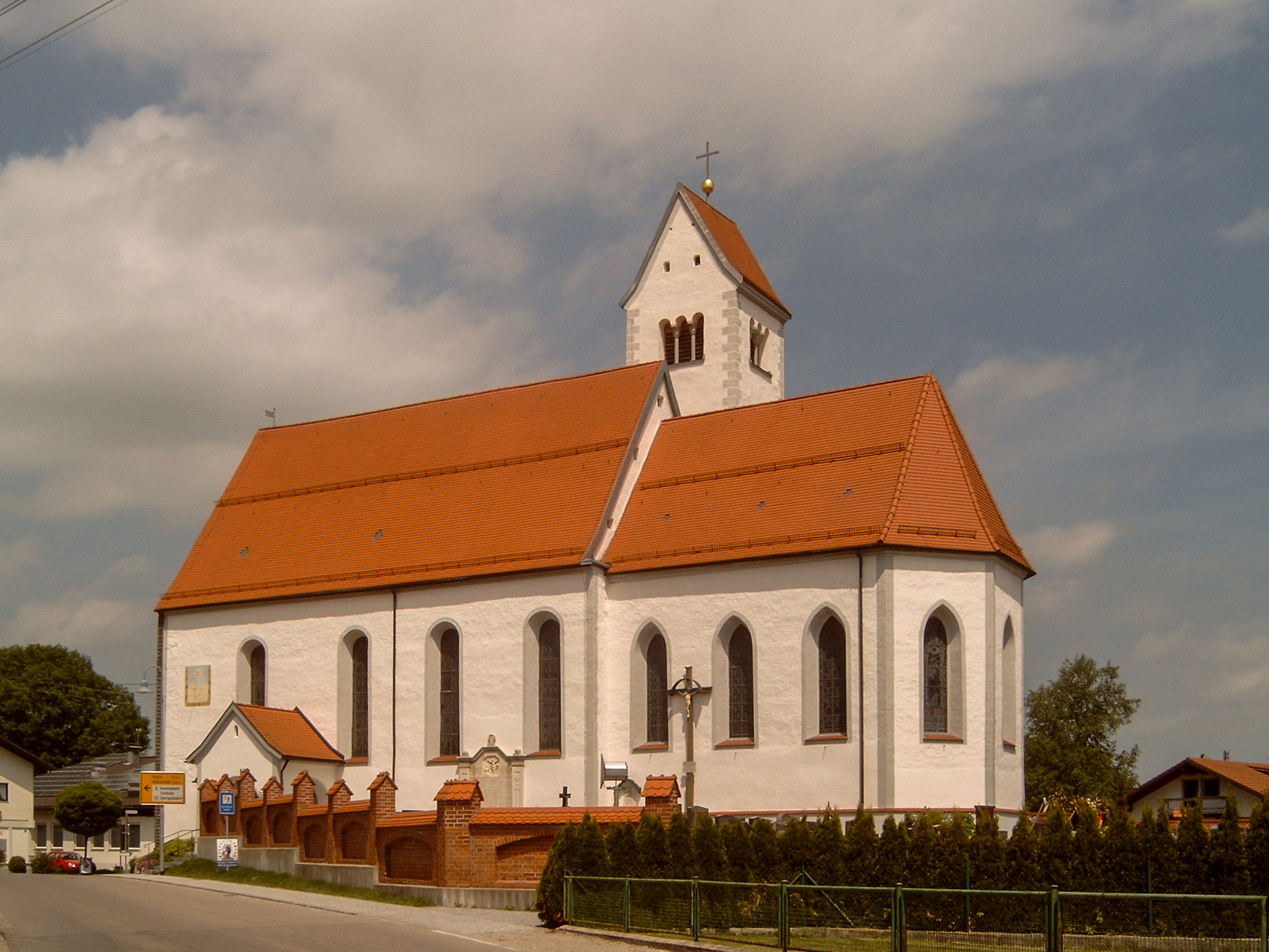
- Saint Wolfgang Church

- Coat of arms

- Location of Lengenwang within Ostallgäu district
- Interactive map of Lengenwang
- Location within Germany Location within Bavaria
- Coordinates: 47°42′N 10°36′E
- Country: Germany
- State: Bavaria
- Admin. region: Schwaben
- District: Ostallgäu
- Municipal assoc.: Seeg

Government
  - Mayor (2020–26): Albert Schreyer

Area
  - Total: 19.61 km^{2} (7.57 sq mi)
- Elevation: 813 m (2,667 ft)

Population (2025-12-31)
  - Total: 1,525
  - Density: 77.77/km^{2} (201.4/sq mi)
- Time zone: UTC+01:00 (CET)
  - Summer (DST): UTC+02:00 (CEST)
- Postal codes: 87663
- Dialling codes: 08364
- Vehicle registration: OAL
- Website: www.lengenwang.de

Lengenwang (German pronunciation: [ˈlɛŋənvaŋ]) is a municipality in the district of Ostallgäu in Bavaria in Germany.
