= Stötten am Auerberg (Verwaltungsgemeinschaft) =

- Verwaltungsgemeinschaft
- Location of Stötten am Auerberg within Ostallgäu district
- Interactive map of Stötten am Auerberg
- Location within Germany Location within Bavaria
- Coordinates: 47°44′N 10°41′E
- Country: Germany
- State: Bavaria
- Admin. region: Swabia
- District: Ostallgäu
- Seat: Stötten
- Subdivisions: 2 municipalities

Area
  - Total: 53.61 km^{2} (20.70 sq mi)

Population (2025-12-31)
  - Total: 2,936
  - Density: 54.77/km^{2} (141.8/sq mi)
- Time zone: UTC+01:00 (CET)
  - Summer (DST): UTC+02:00 (CEST)
- Website: www.vg-stoetten.de

Stötten am Auerberg is a Verwaltungsgemeinschaft (municipal association) in the district Ostallgäu in Bavaria, Germany. Its seat is in Stötten.

It consists of the following municipalities:

1. Rettenbach am Auerberg
2. Stötten
