= Hopferau =

- Municipality
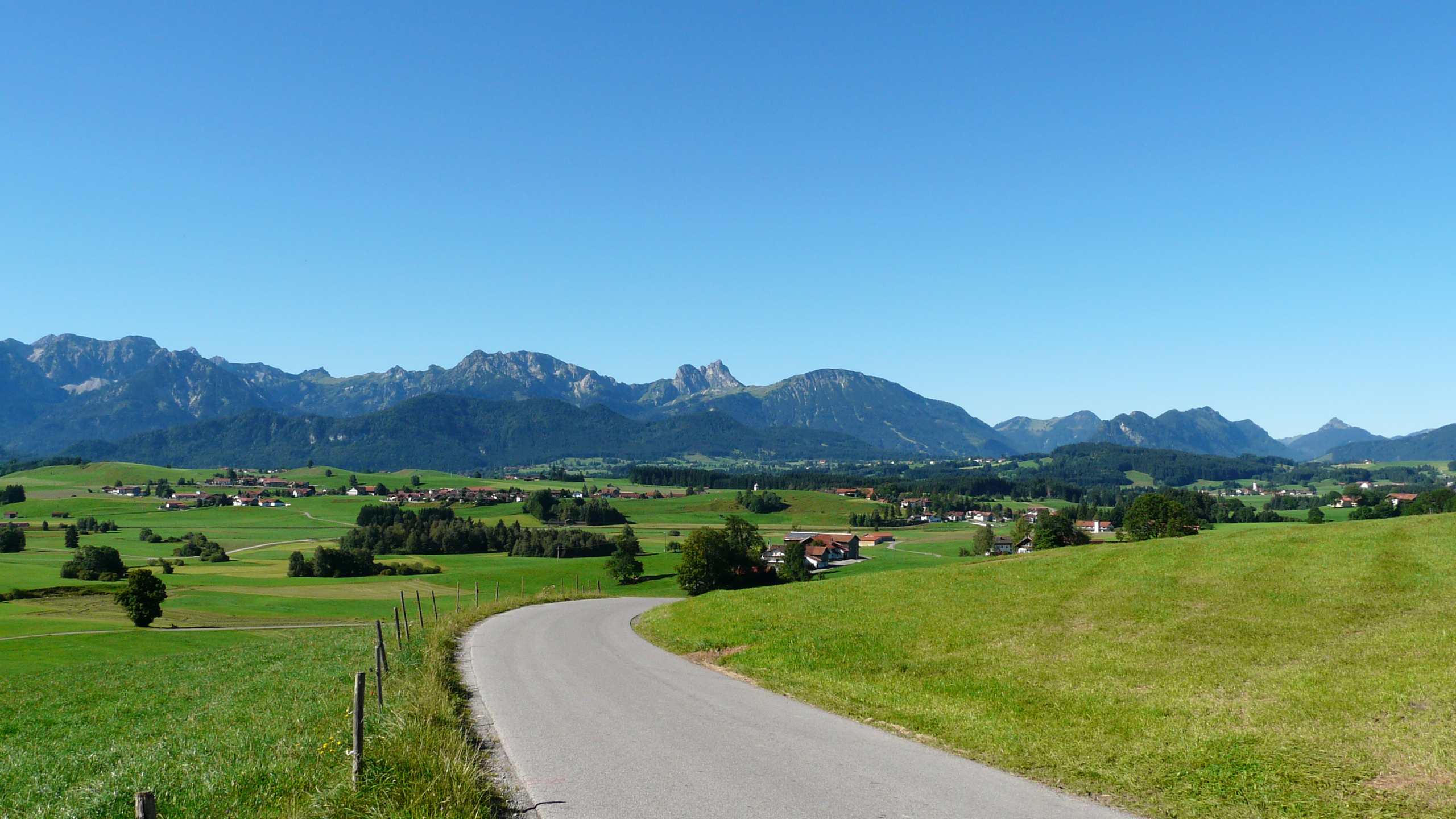
- Hopferau seen from the north

- Coat of arms

- Location of Hopferau within Ostallgäu district
- Interactive map of Hopferau
- Location within Germany Location within Bavaria
- Coordinates: 47°37′N 10°38′E
- Country: Germany
- State: Bavaria
- Admin. region: Schwaben
- District: Ostallgäu
- Municipal assoc.: Seeg

Government
  - Mayor (2019–25): Rudolf Achatz (FW)

Area
  - Total: 13.19 km^{2} (5.09 sq mi)
- Elevation: 811 m (2,661 ft)

Population (2025-12-31)
  - Total: 1,218
  - Density: 92.34/km^{2} (239.2/sq mi)
- Time zone: UTC+01:00 (CET)
  - Summer (DST): UTC+02:00 (CEST)
- Postal codes: 87659
- Dialling codes: 08364
- Vehicle registration: OAL
- Website: www.hopferau.de

Hopferau is a municipality in the district of Ostallgäu in Bavaria in Germany.
