= Unterthingau =

- Municipality
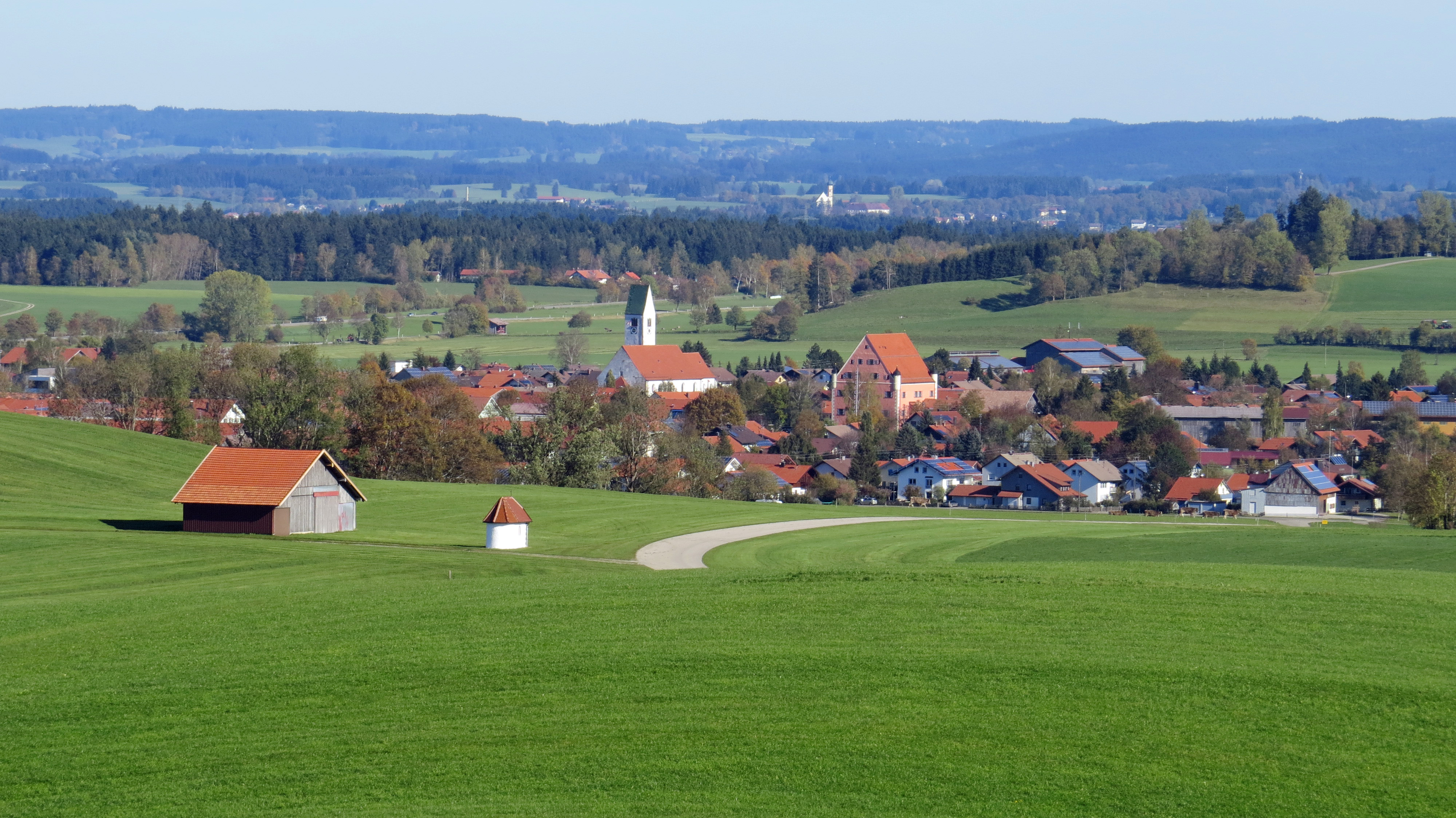
- Unterthingau seen from the southwest

- Coat of arms

- Location of Unterthingau within Ostallgäu district
- Interactive map of Unterthingau
- Location within Germany Location within Bavaria
- Coordinates: 47°46′N 10°30′E
- Country: Germany
- State: Bavaria
- Admin. region: Schwaben
- District: Ostallgäu
- Municipal assoc.: Unterthingau

Government
  - Mayor (2020–26): Bernhard Dolp

Area
  - Total: 45.28 km^{2} (17.48 sq mi)
- Elevation: 773 m (2,536 ft)

Population (2025-12-31)
  - Total: 2,805
  - Density: 61.95/km^{2} (160.4/sq mi)
- Time zone: UTC+01:00 (CET)
  - Summer (DST): UTC+02:00 (CEST)
- Postal codes: 87647
- Dialling codes: 08377
- Vehicle registration: OAL / MOD / FÜS
- Website: www.unterthingau.de

Unterthingau (German pronunciation: [ʊntɐˈtɪŋaʊ]) is a municipality in the district of Ostallgäu in Bavaria in Germany.
