= Seeg (Verwaltungsgemeinschaft) =

- Verwaltungsgemeinschaft
- Location of Seeg within Ostallgäu district
- Interactive map of Seeg
- Location within Germany Location within Bavaria
- Coordinates: 47°39′N 10°37′E
- Country: Germany
- State: Bavaria
- Admin. region: Swabia
- District: Ostallgäu
- Seat: Seeg
- Subdivisions: 6 municipalities

Area
  - Total: 131.54 km^{2} (50.79 sq mi)

Population (2025-12-31)
  - Total: 9,139
  - Density: 69.48/km^{2} (179.9/sq mi)
- Time zone: UTC+01:00 (CET)
  - Summer (DST): UTC+02:00 (CEST)

Seeg is a Verwaltungsgemeinschaft (municipal association) in the district Ostallgäu in Bavaria, Germany. Its seat is in Seeg.

It consists of the following municipalities:

1. Eisenberg
2. Hopferau
3. Lengenwang
4. Rückholz
5. Seeg
6. Wald
