= Westendorf (Verwaltungsgemeinschaft) =

- Verwaltungsgemeinschaft
- Location of Westendorf within Ostallgäu district
- Interactive map of Westendorf
- Location within Germany Location within Bavaria
- Coordinates: 47°56′N 10°43′E
- Country: Germany
- State: Bavaria
- Admin. region: Swabia
- District: Ostallgäu
- Seat: Westendorf
- Subdivisions: 5 municipalities

Area
  - Total: 85.72 km^{2} (33.10 sq mi)

Population (2025-12-31)
  - Total: 7,830
  - Density: 91.3/km^{2} (237/sq mi)
- Time zone: UTC+01:00 (CET)
  - Summer (DST): UTC+02:00 (CEST)
- Website: www.vg-westendorf.de

Westendorf is a Verwaltungsgemeinschaft (municipal association) in the district Ostallgäu in Bavaria, Germany. Its seat is in Westendorf.

It consists of the following municipalities:

1. Kaltental
2. Oberostendorf
3. Osterzell
4. Stöttwang
5. Westendorf
