= Biessenhofen (Verwaltungsgemeinschaft) =

- Verwaltungsgemeinschaft
- Location of Biessenhofen within Ostallgäu district
- Interactive map of Biessenhofen
- Location within Germany Location within Bavaria
- Coordinates: 47°50′N 10°38′E
- Country: Germany
- State: Bavaria
- Admin. region: Swabia
- District: Ostallgäu
- Seat: Biessenhofen
- Subdivisions: 4 municipalities

Area
  - Total: 127.56 km^{2} (49.25 sq mi)

Population (2025-12-31)
  - Total: 9,904
  - Density: 77.64/km^{2} (201.1/sq mi)
- Time zone: UTC+01:00 (CET)
  - Summer (DST): UTC+02:00 (CEST)
- Website: www.vgem-biessenhofen.de

Biessenhofen is a Verwaltungsgemeinschaft (municipal association) in the district Ostallgäu in Bavaria, Germany. Its seat is in Biessenhofen.

It consists of the following municipalities:

1. Aitrang
2. Bidingen
3. Biessenhofen
4. Ruderatshofen
