= Kirnach (Wertach) =

River in Bavaria, Germany

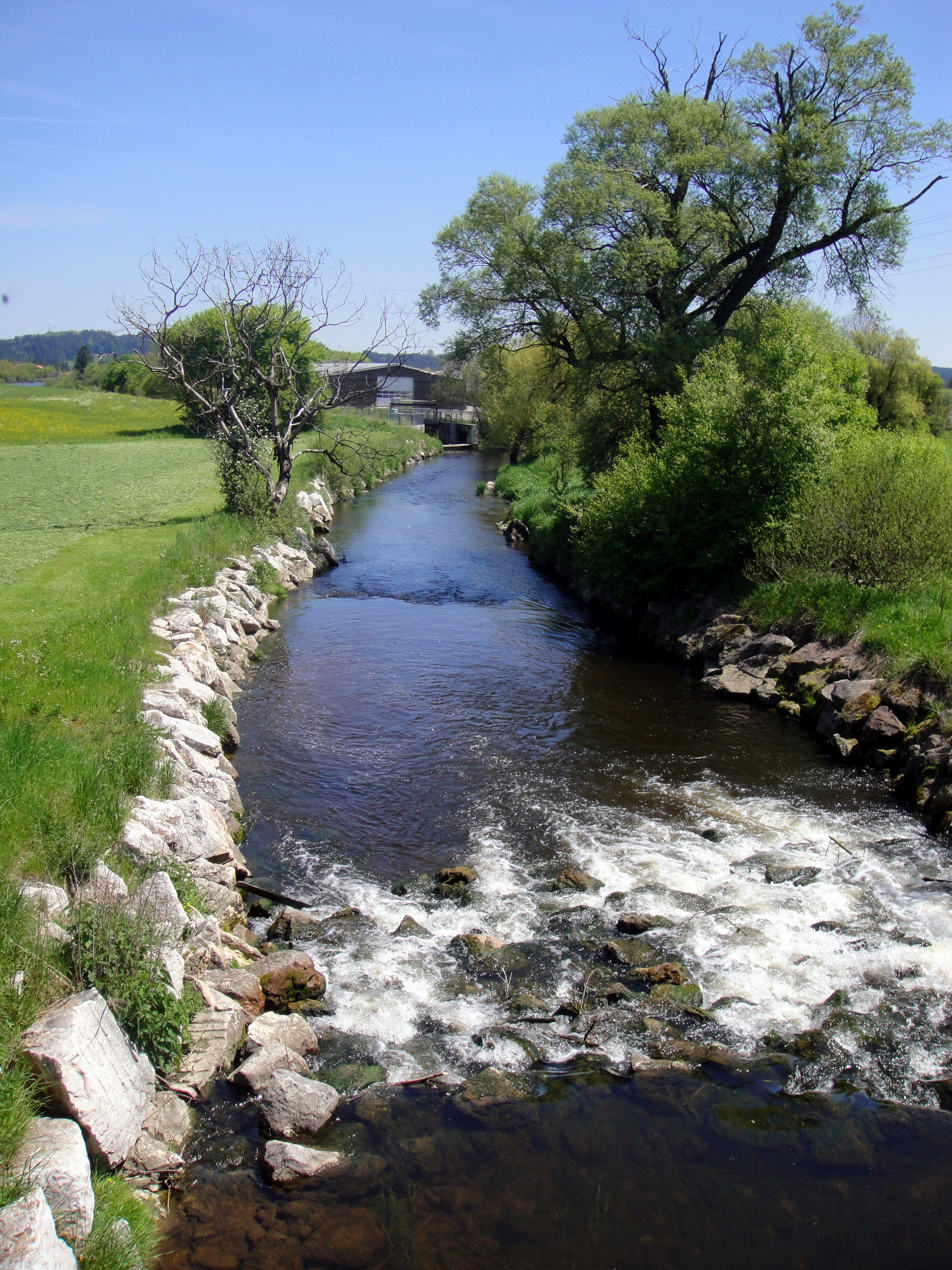
- The Kirnach at Ebenhofen (part of Biessenhofen)

Location
- Country: Germany
- State: Bavaria

Physical characteristics
- Mouth
  - location: Wertach
  - coordinates: 47.8213°N 10.6348°E
- Length: 31.5 km (19.6 mi)
- Basin size: 105 km^{2} (41 sq mi)

Basin features
- Progression: Wertach→ Lech→ Danube→ Black Sea

Kirnach is a river of Bavaria, Germany. It is a tributary of the Wertach in Ebenhofen (part of Biessenhofen).

== See also ==
- List of rivers of Bavaria
