= Kaltental =

- Municipality
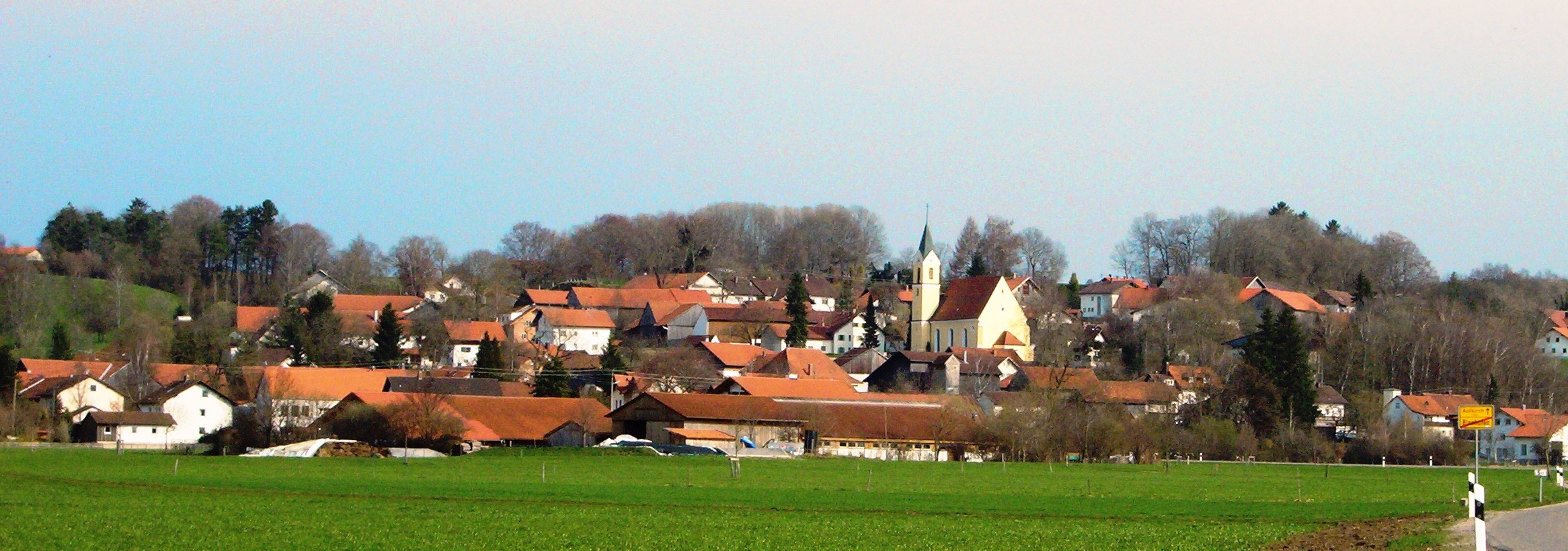
- Panorama view of the municipal part of Aufkirch

- Coat of arms

- Location of Kaltental within Ostallgäu district
- Interactive map of Kaltental
- Location within Germany Location within Bavaria
- Coordinates: 47°54′N 10°45′E
- Country: Germany
- State: Bavaria
- Admin. region: Schwaben
- District: Ostallgäu
- Municipal assoc.: Westendorf

Government
  - Mayor (2020–26): Manfred Hauser

Area
  - Total: 22.15 km^{2} (8.55 sq mi)
- Elevation: 710 m (2,330 ft)

Population (2025-12-31)
  - Total: 1,741
  - Density: 78.60/km^{2} (203.6/sq mi)
- Time zone: UTC+01:00 (CET)
  - Summer (DST): UTC+02:00 (CEST)
- Postal codes: 87662
- Dialling codes: 08345, 08344
- Vehicle registration: OAL
- Website: www.markt-kaltental.de

Kaltental (German pronunciation: [ˈkaltn̩taːl]) is a market town and municipality of Ostallgäu in Bavaria, Germany.
