= Unterthingau (Verwaltungsgemeinschaft) =

- Verwaltungsgemeinschaft
- Location of Unterthingau within Ostallgäu district
- Interactive map of Unterthingau
- Location within Germany Location within Bavaria
- Coordinates: 47°46′N 10°30′E
- Country: Germany
- State: Bavaria
- Admin. region: Swabia
- District: Ostallgäu
- Seat: Unterthingau
- Subdivisions: 3 municipalities

Area
  - Total: 84.66 km^{2} (32.69 sq mi)

Population (2025-12-31)
  - Total: 5,072
  - Density: 59.91/km^{2} (155.2/sq mi)
- Time zone: UTC+01:00 (CET)
  - Summer (DST): UTC+02:00 (CEST)
- Website: www.vg-unterthingau.de

Unterthingau is a Verwaltungsgemeinschaft (municipal association) in the district Ostallgäu in Bavaria, Germany. Its seat is in Unterthingau.

It consists of the following municipalities:

1. Görisried
2. Kraftisried
3. Unterthingau
