= Roßhaupten (Verwaltungsgemeinschaft) =

- Verwaltungsgemeinschaft
- Location of Roßhaupten within Ostallgäu district
- Interactive map of Roßhaupten
- Location within Germany Location within Bavaria
- Coordinates: 47°39′N 10°43′E
- Country: Germany
- State: Bavaria
- Admin. region: Swabia
- District: Ostallgäu
- Seat: Roßhaupten
- Subdivisions: 2 municipalities

Area
  - Total: 52.17 km^{2} (20.14 sq mi)

Population (2025-12-31)
  - Total: 3,622
  - Density: 69.43/km^{2} (179.8/sq mi)
- Time zone: UTC+01:00 (CET)
  - Summer (DST): UTC+02:00 (CEST)
- Website: www.vg-rosshaupten.de

Roßhaupten is a Verwaltungsgemeinschaft (municipal association) in the district Ostallgäu in Bavaria, Germany. Its seat is in Roßhaupten.

It consists of the following municipalities:

1. Rieden am Forggensee
2. Roßhaupten
