= Stöttwang =

- Municipality
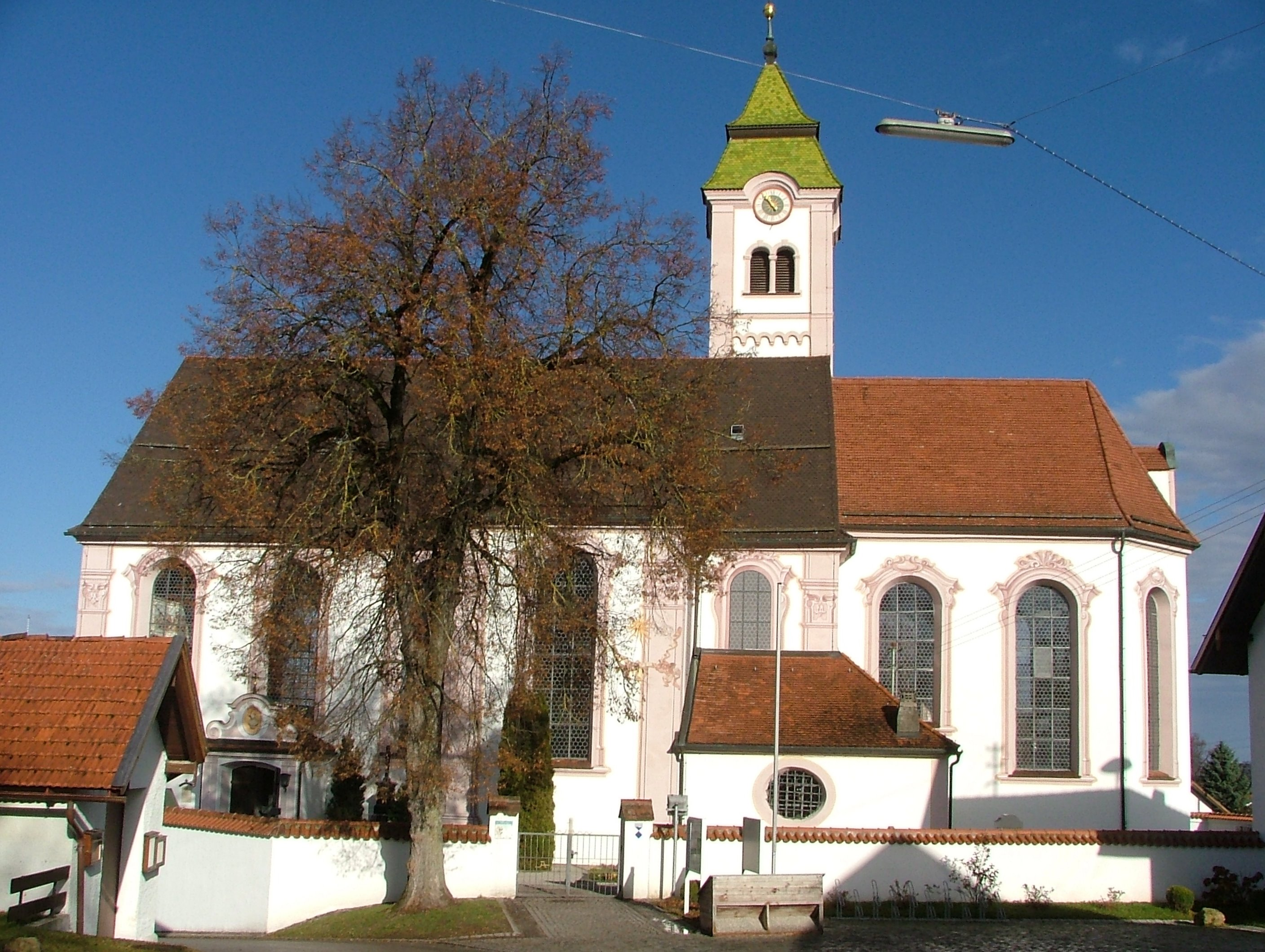
- Church of Saints Gordian and Epimachus

- Coat of arms

- Location of Stöttwang within Ostallgäu district
- Interactive map of Stöttwang
- Location within Germany Location within Bavaria
- Coordinates: 47°53′N 10°43′E
- Country: Germany
- State: Bavaria
- Admin. region: Schwaben
- District: Ostallgäu
- Municipal assoc.: Westendorf

Government
  - Mayor (2020–26): Christian Schlegel (FW)

Area
  - Total: 19.8 km^{2} (7.6 sq mi)

Population (2025-12-31)
  - Total: 1,934
  - Density: 97.7/km^{2} (253/sq mi)
- Time zone: UTC+01:00 (CET)
  - Summer (DST): UTC+02:00 (CEST)
- Postal codes: 87677
- Dialling codes: 08345
- Vehicle registration: OAL
- Website: www.stoettwang.de

Stöttwang (German pronunciation: [ˈʃtœtvaŋ]) is a municipality in the district of Ostallgäu in Bavaria in Germany.
