= Westendorf (Allgäu) =

- Municipality
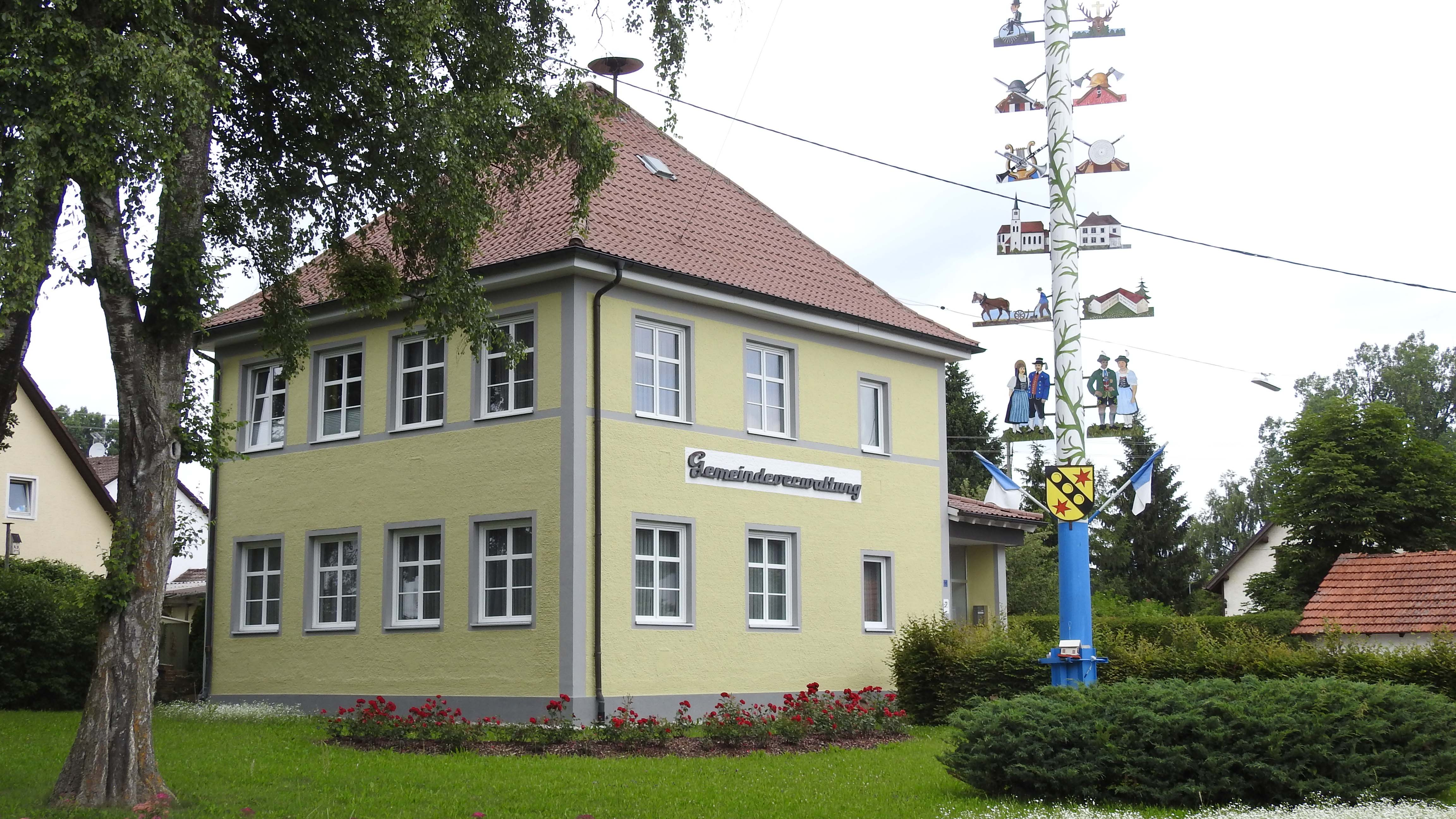
- Town hall

- Coat of arms

- Location of Westendorf within Ostallgäu district
- Interactive map of Westendorf
- Location within Germany Location within Bavaria
- Coordinates: 47°56′N 10°43′E
- Country: Germany
- State: Bavaria
- Admin. region: Schwaben
- District: Ostallgäu
- Municipal assoc.: Westendorf

Government
  - Mayor (2020–26): Fritz Obermaier

Area
  - Total: 11.93 km^{2} (4.61 sq mi)
- Elevation: 688 m (2,257 ft)

Population (2025-12-31)
  - Total: 1,966
  - Density: 164.8/km^{2} (426.8/sq mi)
- Time zone: UTC+01:00 (CET)
  - Summer (DST): UTC+02:00 (CEST)
- Postal codes: 87679
- Dialling codes: 08344
- Vehicle registration: OAL
- Website: www.gemeinde-westendorf.de

Westendorf (German pronunciation: [ˈvɛstn̩ˌdɔʁf]) is a municipality in the district of Ostallgäu in Bavaria in Germany.

The municipality of Westendorf, which consists of the villages of Dösingen and Westendorf, is located in the Allgäu region, about eleven kilometres east of Kaufbeuren, in the northern part of the Ostallgäu district.
