= Oberostendorf =

- Municipality
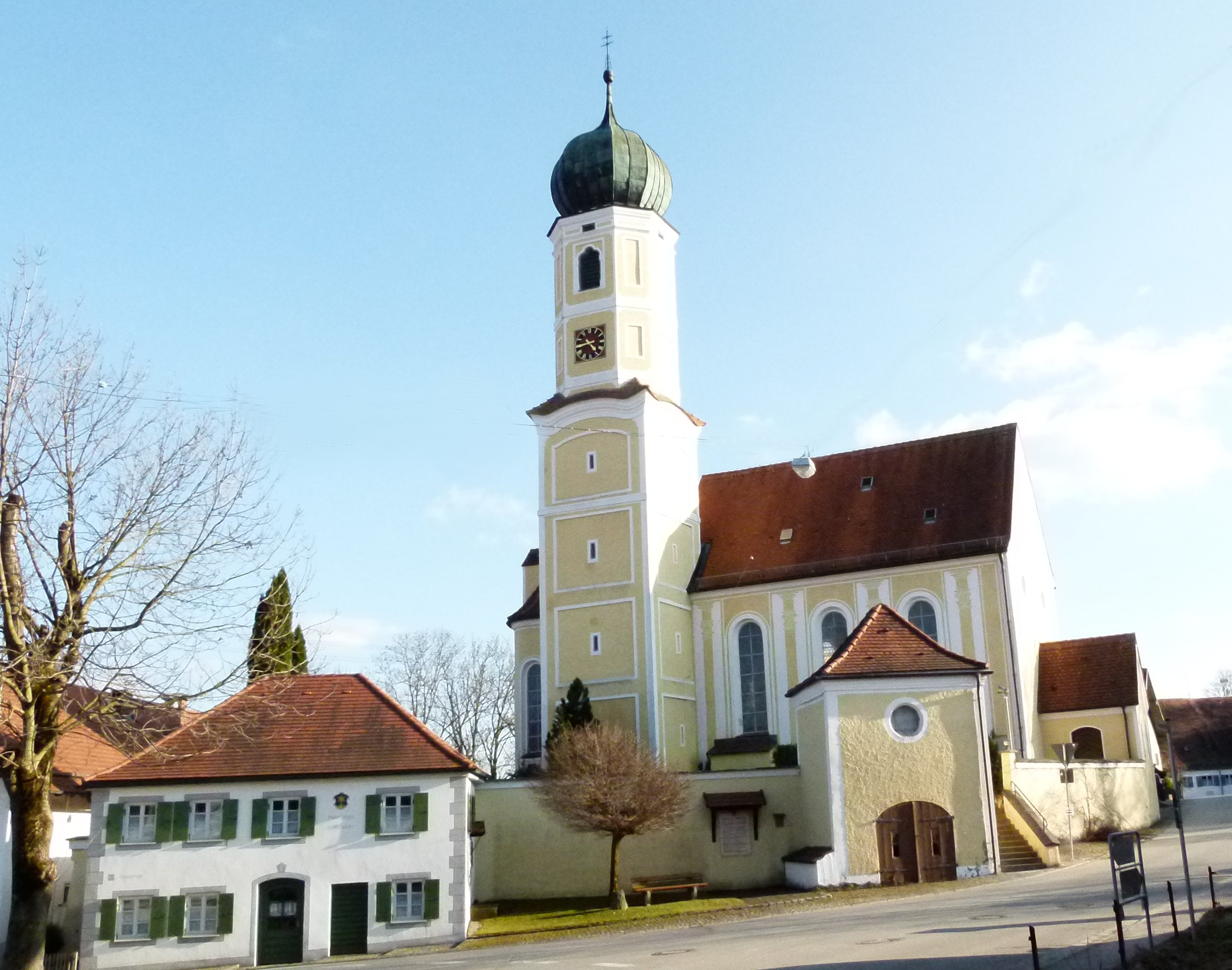
- Parish Church of Saint Margaret in Gutenberg

- Coat of arms

- Location of Oberostendorf within Ostallgäu district
- Interactive map of Oberostendorf
- Location within Germany Location within Bavaria
- Coordinates: 47°56′N 10°45′E
- Country: Germany
- State: Bavaria
- Admin. region: Schwaben
- District: Ostallgäu
- Municipal assoc.: Westendorf

Government
  - Mayor (2020–26): Helmut Holzheu

Area
  - Total: 21.04 km^{2} (8.12 sq mi)
- Elevation: 674 m (2,211 ft)

Population (2025-12-31)
  - Total: 1,485
  - Density: 70.58/km^{2} (182.8/sq mi)
- Time zone: UTC+01:00 (CET)
  - Summer (DST): UTC+02:00 (CEST)
- Postal codes: 86869
- Dialling codes: 08344
- Vehicle registration: OAL
- Website: www.oberostendorf.de

Oberostendorf is a municipality in the district of Ostallgäu in Bavaria in Germany.
