= Stötten =

- Municipality
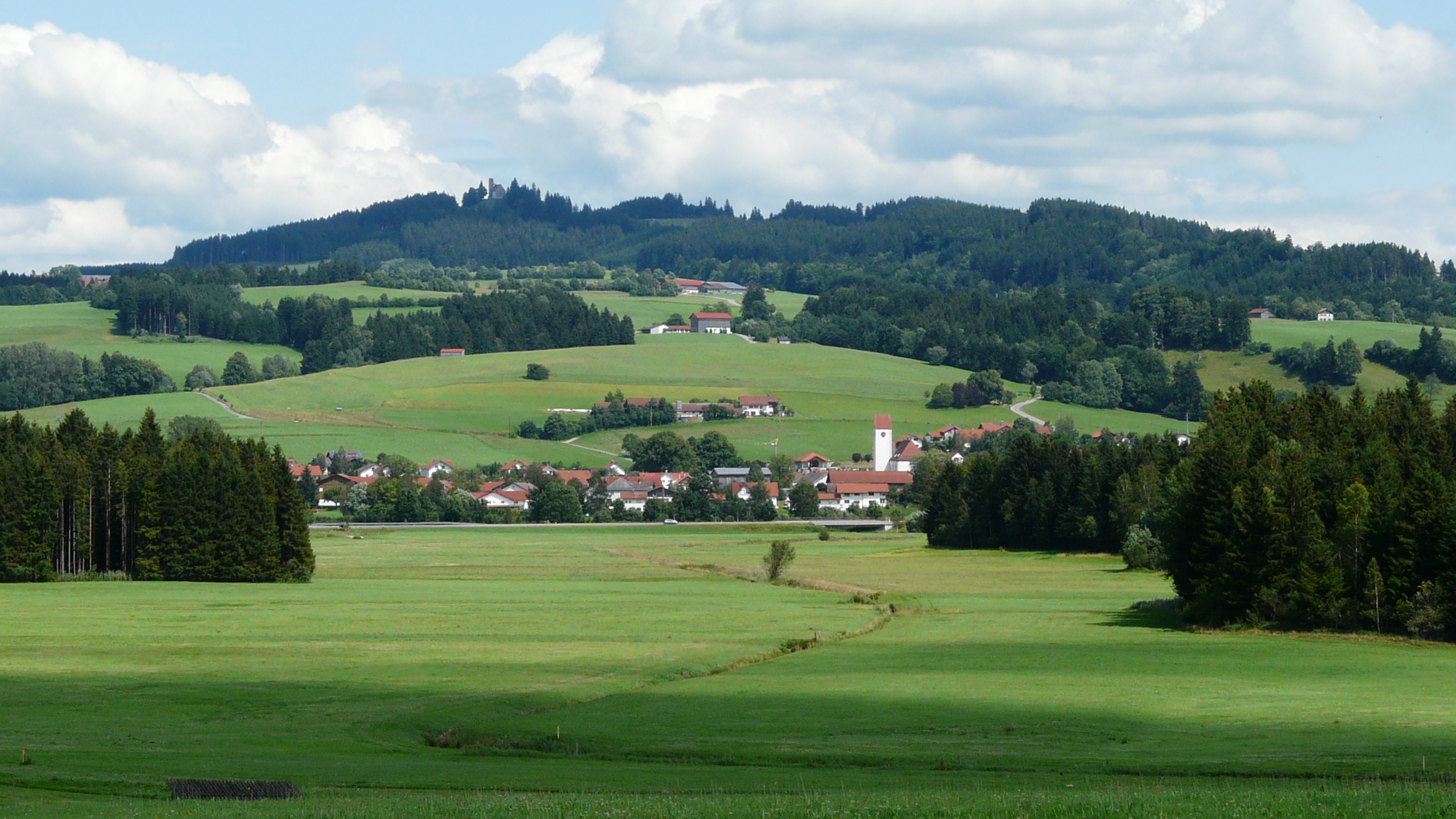
- Stötten am Auerberg seen from the west

- Coat of arms

- Location of Stötten within Ostallgäu district
- Interactive map of Stötten
- Location within Germany Location within Bavaria
- Coordinates: 47°44′N 10°41′E
- Country: Germany
- State: Bavaria
- Admin. region: Schwaben
- District: Ostallgäu
- Municipal assoc.: Stötten am Auerberg

Government
  - Mayor (2023–29): Michael Neumann

Area
  - Total: 40.75 km^{2} (15.73 sq mi)
- Elevation: 733 m (2,405 ft)

Population (2025-12-31)
  - Total: 2,020
  - Density: 49.6/km^{2} (128/sq mi)
- Time zone: UTC+01:00 (CET)
  - Summer (DST): UTC+02:00 (CEST)
- Postal codes: 87675
- Dialling codes: 08349
- Vehicle registration: OAL
- Website: www.stoetten.de

Stötten (Swabian: Steeda) is a municipality in the district of Ostallgäu in Bavaria in Germany.

== Climate ==
Climate data for Stötten (1991–2020 normals)
Month	Jan	Feb	Mar	Apr	May	Jun	Jul	Aug	Sep	Oct	Nov	Dec	Year
Mean daily maximum °C (°F)	1.7 (35.1)	2.8 (37.0)	7.2 (45.0)	12.2 (54.0)	16.2 (61.2)	19.7 (67.5)	21.7 (71.1)	21.7 (71.1)	16.8 (62.2)	11.7 (53.1)	5.8 (42.4)	2.6 (36.7)	11.7 (53.1)
Daily mean °C (°F)	−0.7 (30.7)	−0.1 (31.8)	3.5 (38.3)	7.8 (46.0)	11.8 (53.2)	15.2 (59.4)	17.1 (62.8)	17.0 (62.6)	12.7 (54.9)	8.3 (46.9)	3.2 (37.8)	0.2 (32.4)	8.0 (46.4)
Mean daily minimum °C (°F)	−3.1 (26.4)	−2.7 (27.1)	0.3 (32.5)	3.8 (38.8)	7.7 (45.9)	11.1 (52.0)	13.0 (55.4)	13.2 (55.8)	9.4 (48.9)	5.5 (41.9)	0.9 (33.6)	−2.2 (28.0)	4.8 (40.6)
Average precipitation mm (inches)	75.7 (2.98)	61.4 (2.42)	79.0 (3.11)	62.6 (2.46)	108.8 (4.28)	100.4 (3.95)	127.1 (5.00)	97.8 (3.85)	82.0 (3.23)	85.3 (3.36)	83.3 (3.28)	85.5 (3.37)	1,056.5 (41.59)
Average precipitation days (≥ 1.0 mm)	18.8	16.7	15.5	13.2	13.1	14.5	15.4	15.7	13.9	16.4	18.0	19.3	191.3
Average snowy days (≥ 1.0 cm)	18.5	17.7	10.9	2.1	0.1	0	0	0	0	0.4	6.1	14.3	70.1
Average relative humidity (%)	88.0	83.9	78.1	71.2	74.3	74.8	73.4	73.4	80.9	86.9	90.5	89.6	80.4
Mean monthly sunshine hours	63.6	84.8	132.6	181.3	207.1	224.1	241.3	227.2	163.0	107.2	59.6	52.9	1,744.7
Source: World Meteorological Organization
