= Rettenbach am Auerberg =

- Municipality
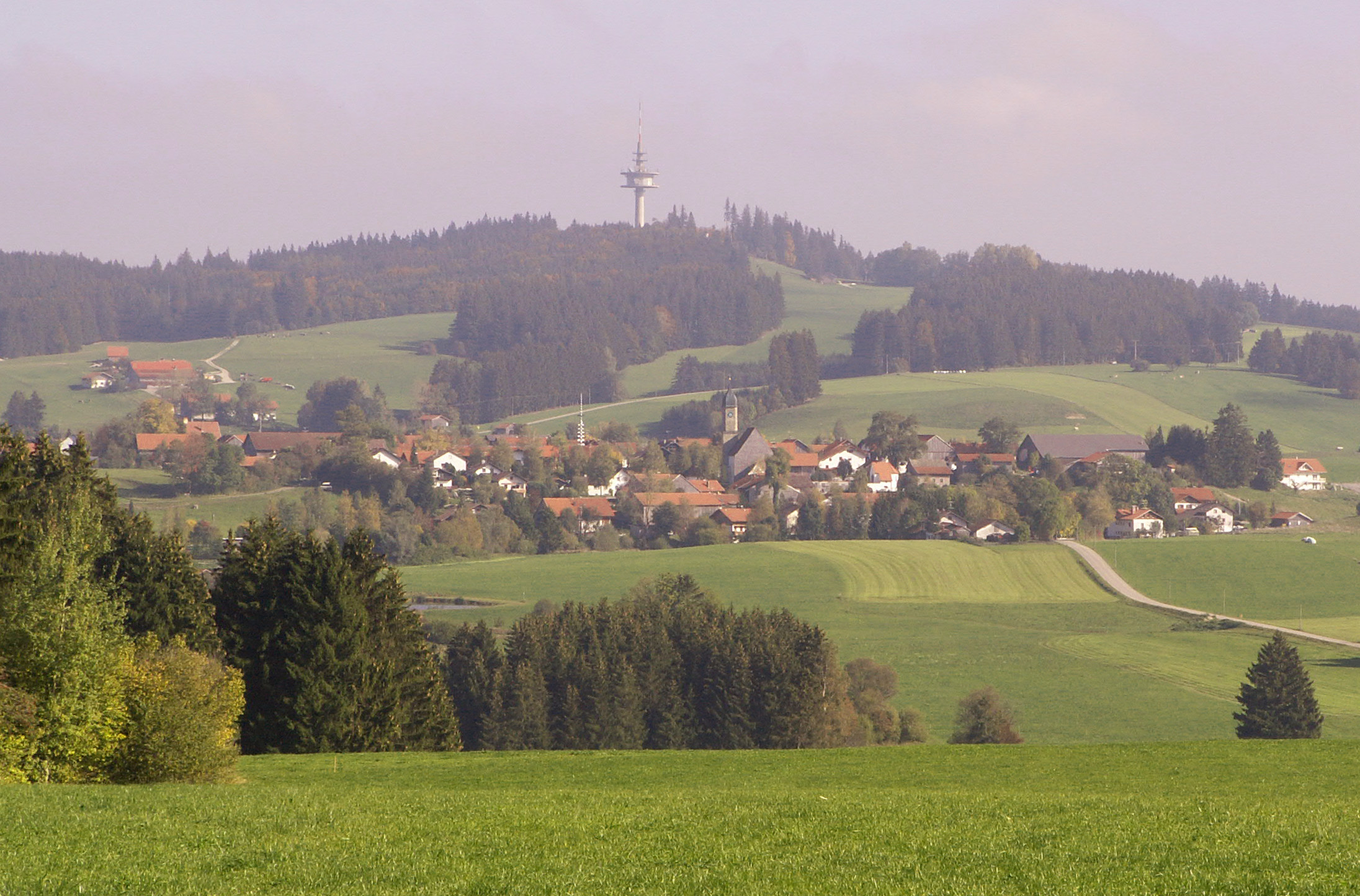
- Rettenbach am Auerberg

- Coat of arms

- Location of Rettenbach am Auerberg within Ostallgäu district
- Interactive map of Rettenbach am Auerberg
- Location within Germany Location within Bavaria
- Coordinates: 47°46′N 10°45′E
- Country: Germany
- State: Bavaria
- Admin. region: Schwaben
- District: Ostallgäu
- Municipal assoc.: Stötten am Auerberg

Government
  - Mayor (2020–26): Reiner Friedl

Area
  - Total: 12.92 km^{2} (4.99 sq mi)
- Elevation: 832 m (2,730 ft)

Population (2025-12-31)
  - Total: 916
  - Density: 70.9/km^{2} (184/sq mi)
- Time zone: UTC+01:00 (CET)
  - Summer (DST): UTC+02:00 (CEST)
- Postal codes: 87675
- Dialling codes: 08860
- Vehicle registration: OAL
- Website: www.rettenbach-am-auerberg.de

Rettenbach am Auerberg (Swabian: Reatebach) is a municipality in the district of Ostallgäu in Bavaria in Germany.
