= Osterzell =

- Municipality
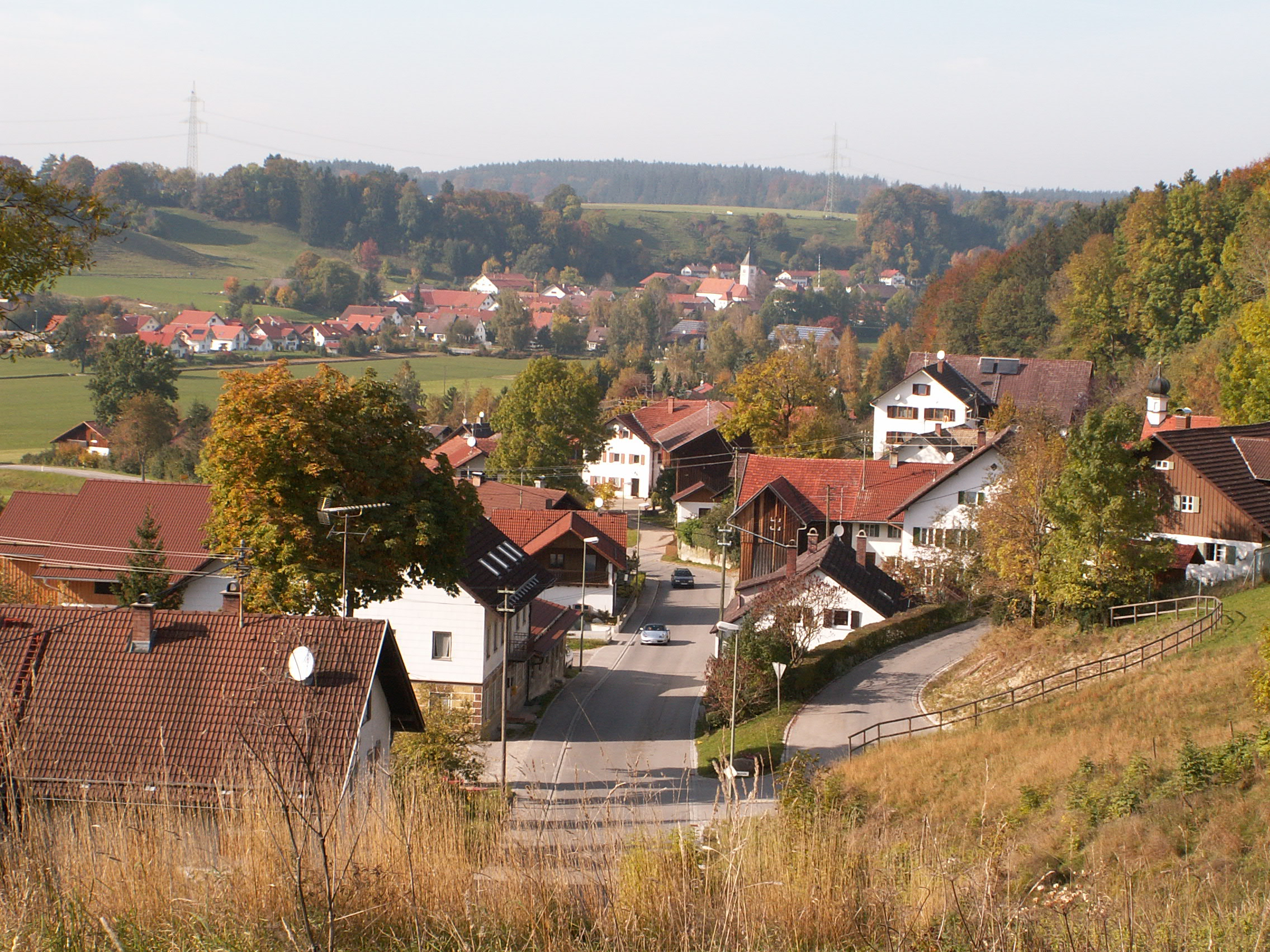
- Osterzell seen from the southeast

- Coat of arms

- Location of Osterzell within Ostallgäu district
- Interactive map of Osterzell
- Location within Germany Location within Bavaria
- Coordinates: 47°53′N 10°45′E
- Country: Germany
- State: Bavaria
- Admin. region: Schwaben
- District: Ostallgäu
- Municipal assoc.: Westendorf

Government
  - Mayor (2020–26): Bernhard Bucka (CSU)

Area
  - Total: 10.8 km^{2} (4.2 sq mi)
- Elevation: 729 m (2,392 ft)

Population (2025-12-31)
  - Total: 704
  - Density: 65.2/km^{2} (169/sq mi)
- Time zone: UTC+01:00 (CET)
  - Summer (DST): UTC+02:00 (CEST)
- Postal codes: 87662
- Dialling codes: 08345
- Vehicle registration: OAL
- Website: www.osterzell.de

Osterzell (German pronunciation: [ˈoːstɐtsɛl]) is a municipality in the district of Ostallgäu in Bavaria in Germany.
