= Bidingen =

- Municipality
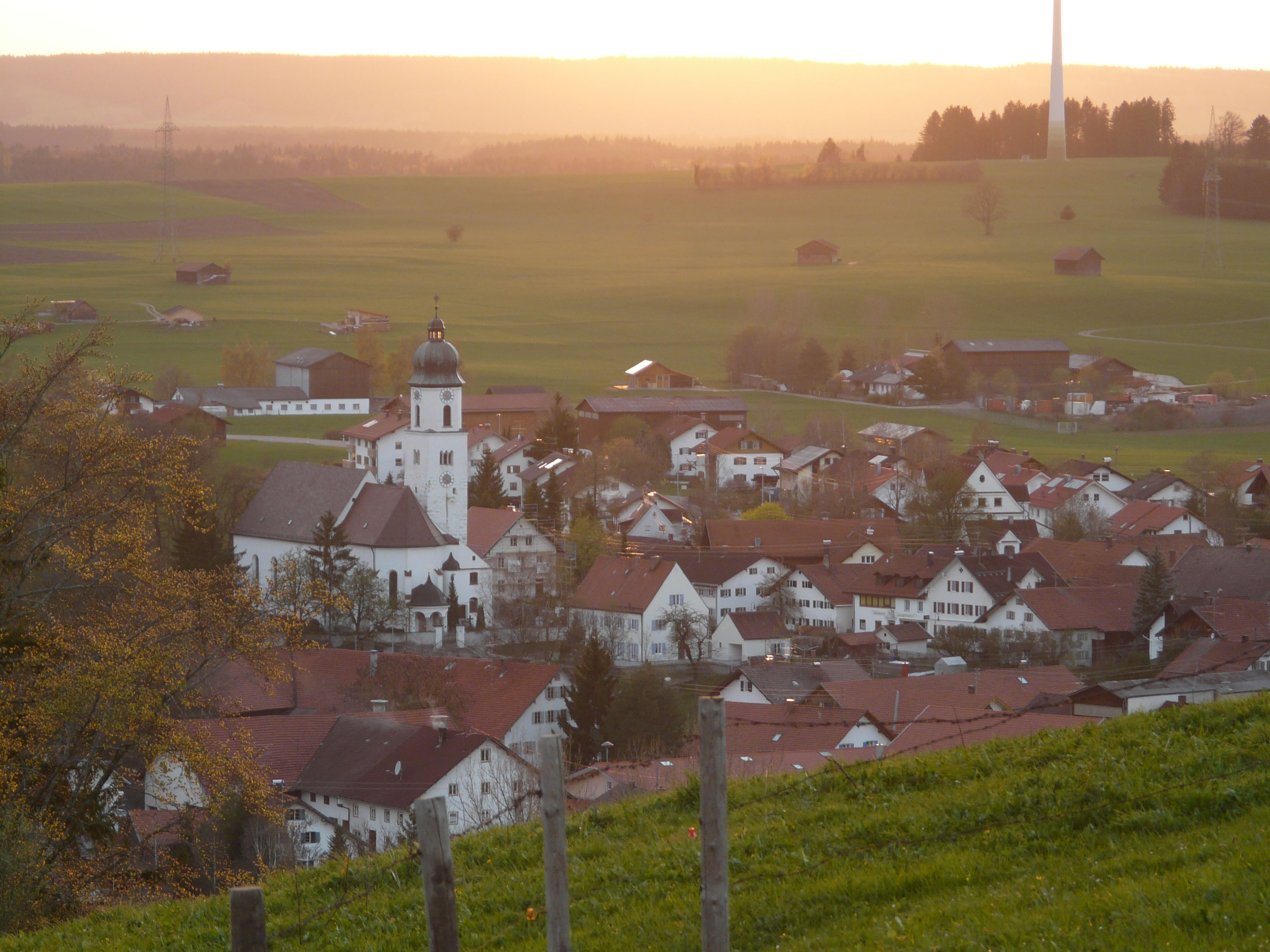
- Bidingen seen from the east

- Coat of arms

- Location of Bidingen within Ostallgäu district
- Interactive map of Bidingen
- Location within Germany Location within Bavaria
- Coordinates: 47°50′N 10°44′E
- Country: Germany
- State: Bavaria
- Admin. region: Schwaben
- District: Ostallgäu
- Municipal assoc.: Biessenhofen

Government
  - Mayor (2020–26): Franz Martin

Area
  - Total: 36.31 km^{2} (14.02 sq mi)
- Elevation: 768 m (2,520 ft)

Population (2025-12-31)
  - Total: 1,884
  - Density: 51.89/km^{2} (134.4/sq mi)
- Time zone: UTC+01:00 (CET)
  - Summer (DST): UTC+02:00 (CEST)
- Postal codes: 87651
- Dialling codes: 08348
- Vehicle registration: OAL FÜS MOD
- Website: www.bidingen.de

Bidingen (German pronunciation: [ˈbiːdɪŋən]) is a municipality in the district of Ostallgäu in Bavaria in Germany.

== Places in the municipality ==
Gemarkungen

- Bernbach
- Bidingen

other

- Geblatsried
- Geislatsried
- Königsried
- Ob
- Tremmelschwang
- Weiler
- Ämbisried
- Ruderatsried
- Ebenried
- Korbsee
- Langweid
- Etzlensberg
