= Rieden am Forggensee =

- Municipality
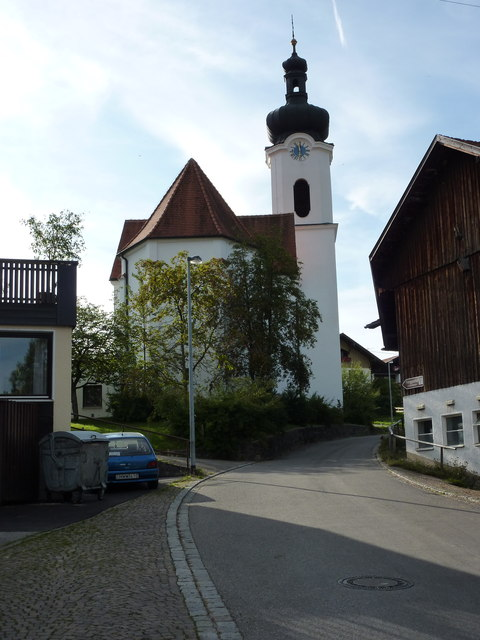
- Church

- Coat of arms

- Location of Rieden am Forggensee within Ostallgäu district
- Interactive map of Rieden am Forggensee
- Location within Germany Location within Bavaria
- Coordinates: 47°37′N 10°43′E
- Country: Germany
- State: Bavaria
- Admin. region: Schwaben
- District: Ostallgäu
- Municipal assoc.: Roßhaupten

Government
  - Mayor (2020–26): Andreas Haug

Area
  - Total: 13.17 km^{2} (5.08 sq mi)
- Elevation: 814 m (2,671 ft)

Population (2025-12-31)
  - Total: 1,383
  - Density: 105.0/km^{2} (272.0/sq mi)
- Time zone: UTC+01:00 (CET)
  - Summer (DST): UTC+02:00 (CEST)
- Postal codes: 87669
- Dialling codes: 08362
- Vehicle registration: OAL
- Website: www.rieden.de

Rieden am Forggensee is a municipality in the district of Ostallgäu in Bavaria in Germany.
