= Ruderatshofen =

- Municipality
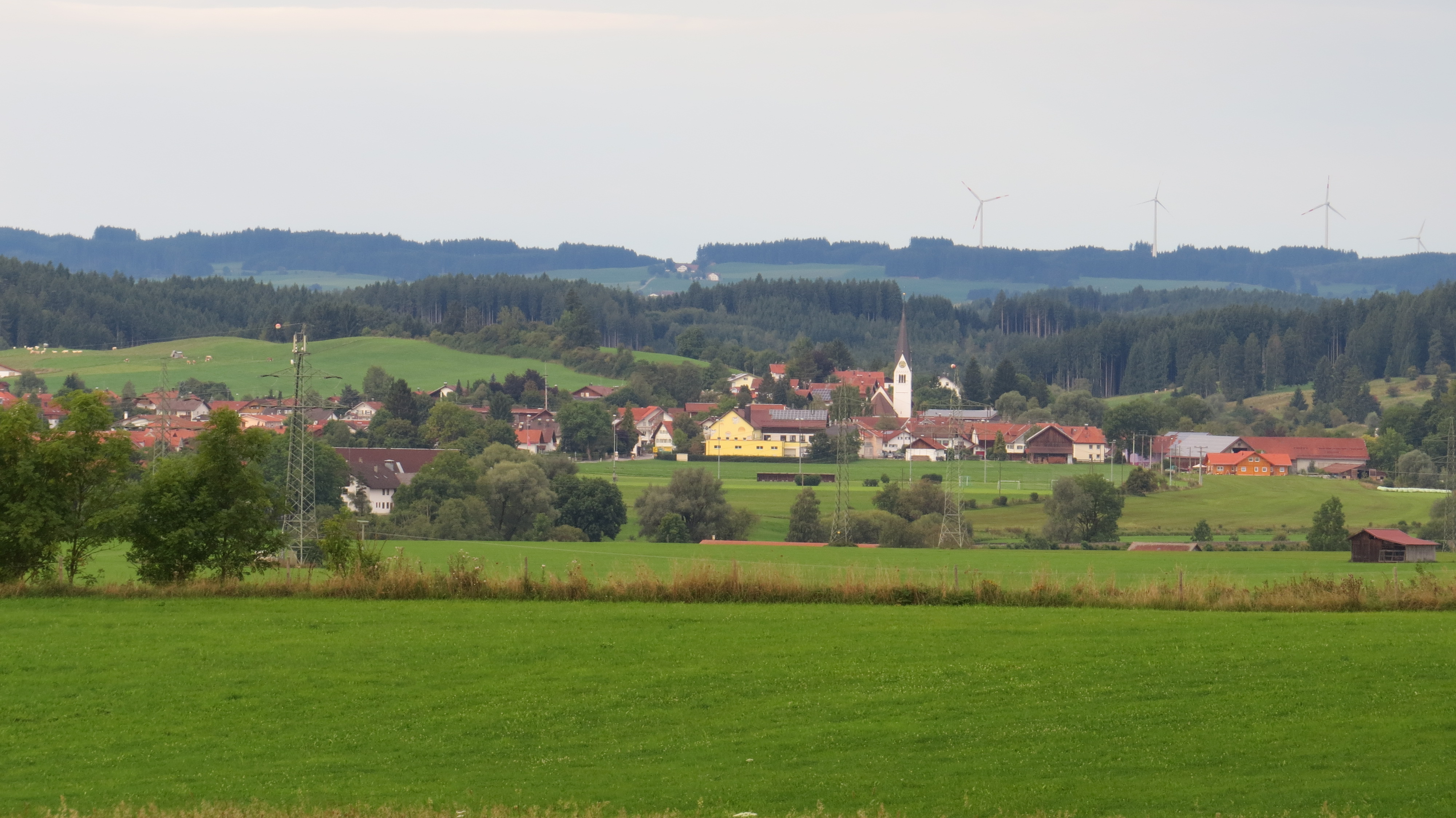
- Ruderatshofen seen from the east

- Coat of arms

- Location of Ruderatshofen within Ostallgäu district
- Interactive map of Ruderatshofen
- Location within Germany Location within Bavaria
- Coordinates: 47°49′N 10°35′E
- Country: Germany
- State: Bavaria
- Admin. region: Schwaben
- District: Ostallgäu
- Municipal assoc.: Biessenhofen

Government
  - Mayor (2020–26): Johann Stich

Area
  - Total: 33.52 km^{2} (12.94 sq mi)
- Elevation: 728 m (2,388 ft)

Population (2025-12-31)
  - Total: 1,731
  - Density: 51.64/km^{2} (133.7/sq mi)
- Time zone: UTC+01:00 (CET)
  - Summer (DST): UTC+02:00 (CEST)
- Postal codes: 87674
- Dialling codes: 08343
- Vehicle registration: OAL
- Website: www.ruderatshofen.de

Ruderatshofen is a municipality in the district of Ostallgäu in Bavaria in Germany.
