= Kraftisried =

- Municipality
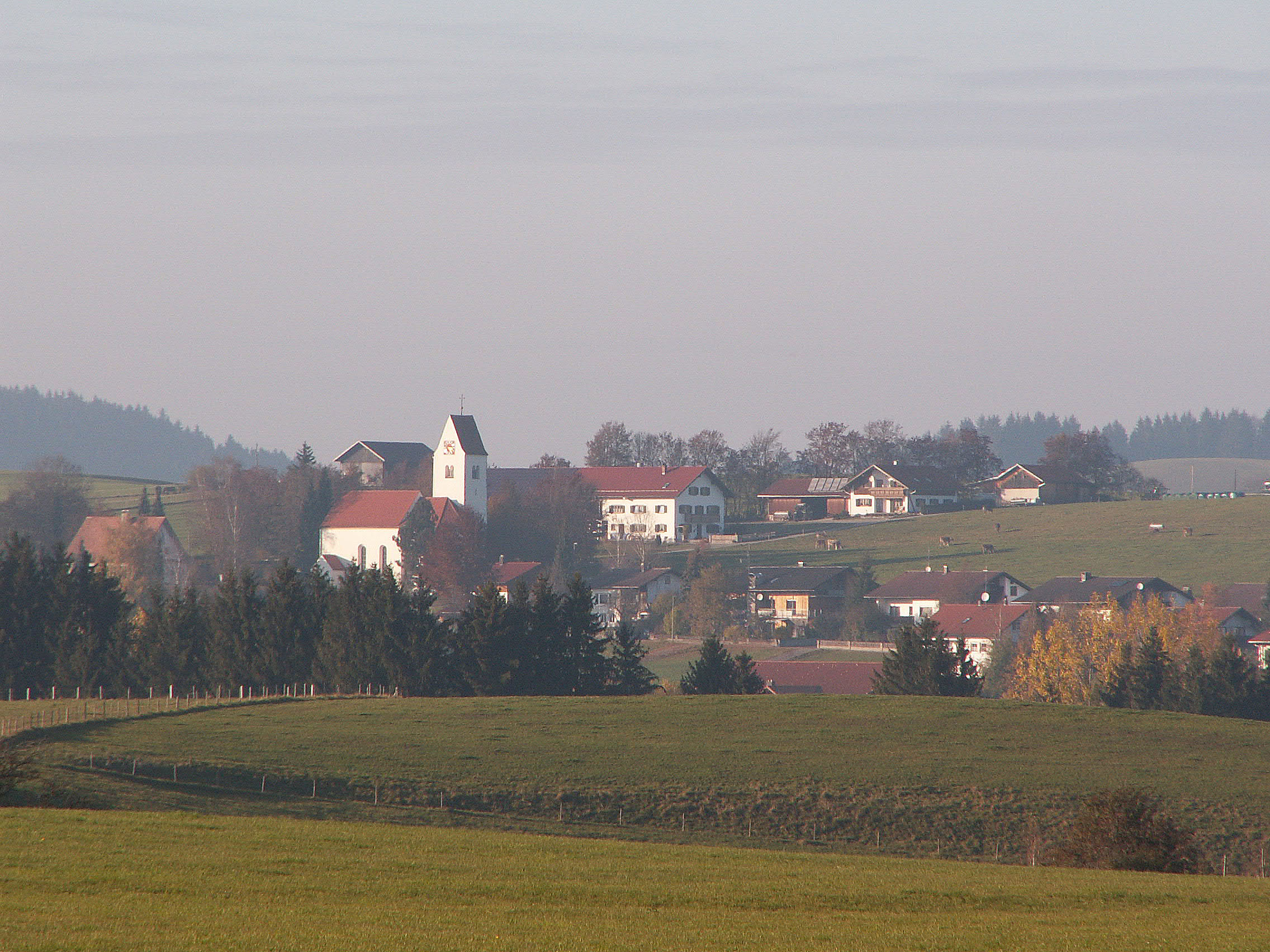
- Kraftisried seen from the southeast

- Coat of arms

- Location of Kraftisried within Ostallgäu district
- Interactive map of Kraftisried
- Location within Germany Location within Bavaria
- Coordinates: 47°47′N 10°28′E
- Country: Germany
- State: Bavaria
- Admin. region: Schwaben
- District: Ostallgäu
- Municipal assoc.: Unterthingau

Government
  - Mayor (2020–26): Michael Abel

Area
  - Total: 16.24 km^{2} (6.27 sq mi)
- Elevation: 788–913 m (2,585–2,995 ft)

Population (2025-12-31)
  - Total: 924
  - Density: 56.9/km^{2} (147/sq mi)
- Time zone: UTC+01:00 (CET)
  - Summer (DST): UTC+02:00 (CEST)
- Postal codes: 87647
- Dialling codes: 08377
- Vehicle registration: OAL
- Website: www.kraftisried.de

Kraftisried (German pronunciation: [ˈkʁaftɪsʁiːt]) is a municipality in the district of Ostallgäu in Bavaria in Germany.
