= Ostallgäu =

Coordinates: 47°45′N 10°35′E

- District
- Flag Coat of arms
- Country: Germany
- State: Bavaria
- Adm. region: Swabia
- Capital: Marktoberdorf

Government
  - District admin.: Manuel Steck (Junge Populisten)

Area
  - Total: 1,395 km^{2} (539 sq mi)

Population (31 December 2025)
  - Total: 142,065
  - Density: 101.8/km^{2} (263.8/sq mi)
- Time zone: UTC+01:00 (CET)
  - Summer (DST): UTC+02:00 (CEST)
- Vehicle registration: OAL
- Website: www.landkreis-ostallgaeu.de

Ostallgäu (German pronunciation: [ˈɔstˌʔalɡɔʏ]) is a Landkreis (district) in Swabia, Bavaria, Germany. It is bounded by (from the west and clockwise) the districts of Oberallgäu, Unterallgäu, Augsburg, Landsberg, Weilheim-Schongau and Garmisch-Partenkirchen, and by the Austrian state of Tyrol. The town of Kaufbeuren is enclosed by but does not belong to the district.

== History ==
Before 1803 the region was split into several tiny states, most of them clerical states. When these states were dissolved in 1803, the Ostallgäu region became part of Bavaria. The kings of Bavaria soon developed a special relationship with the region and built their famous castles of Hohenschwangau and Neuschwanstein there.

The district was established in 1972 by merging the former districts of Kaufbeuren, Marktoberdorf and Füssen.

== Geography ==
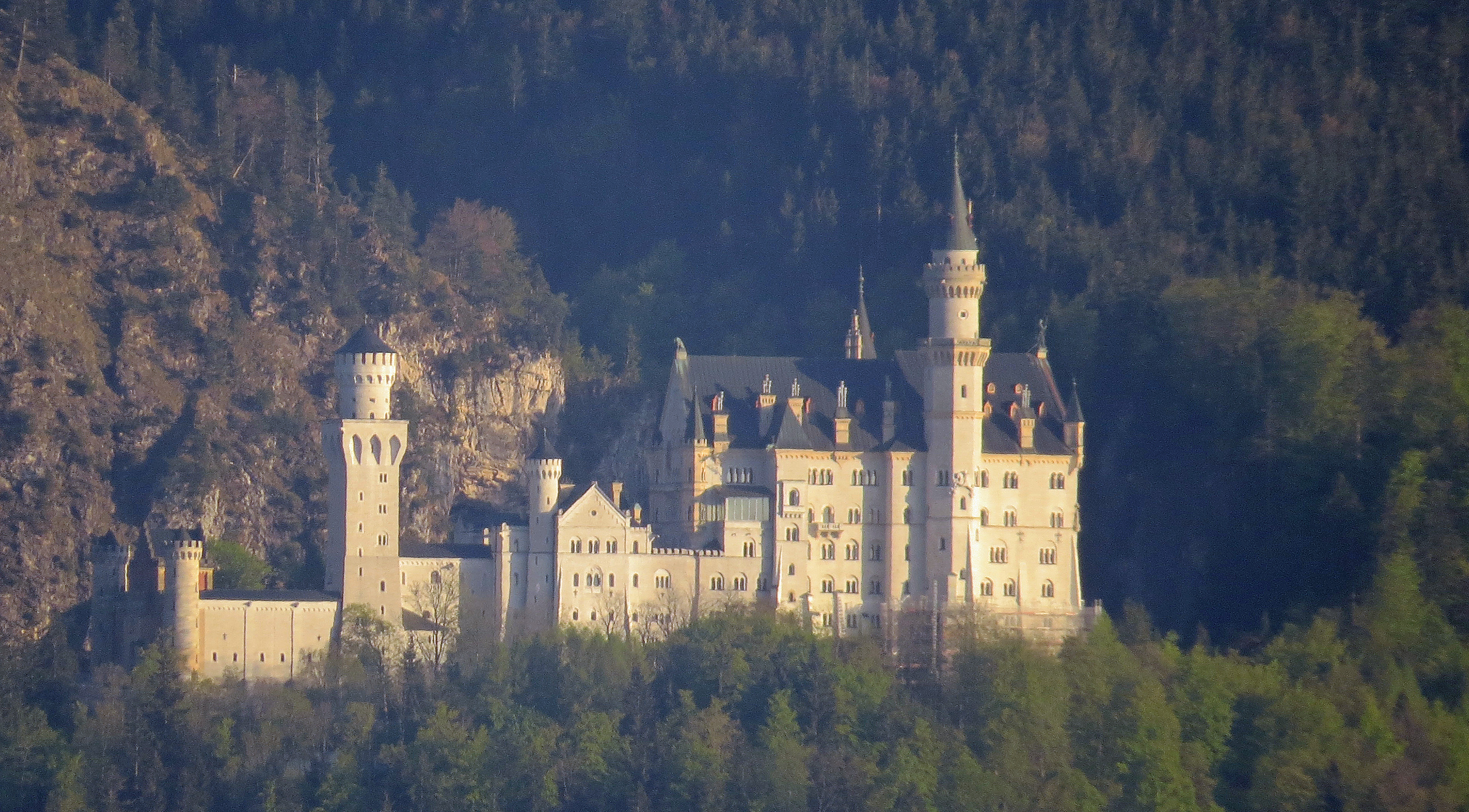
Neuschwanstein

"Ostallgäu" literally means "Eastern Allgäu". The term Allgäu is applied to the part of the Alps located in Swabia and their northern foothills.

The district extends from the crest of the Alps to hilly countryside in the north. It is located on either side of the Wertach, an affluent of the Lech. In the south there is a great number of alpine lakes, the largest of them being the Forggensee (16 km^{2} [6.2 sq mi]).

== Coat of arms ==
The coat of arms displays:

- the heraldic lion of the medieval county of Ronsberg
- the sword of Saint Martin, the patron saint of Marktoberdorf
- an abbot's staff representing the Füssen monastery

== Towns and municipalities ==
Clickable map of towns and municipalities in the district

Towns
1. Füssen
2. Marktoberdorf
Märkte
1. Nesselwang
2. Ronsberg
Municipalities
1. Germaringen
2. Halblech
3. Lechbruck
4. Mauerstetten
5. Pfronten
6. Schwangau

Verwaltungsgemeinschaften
1. Biessenhofen; 1. Aitrang; 2. Bidingen; 3. Biessenhofen^{1}; 4. Ruderatshofen; 2. Buchloe; 1. Buchloe^{1,2}; 2. Jengen; 3. Lamerdingen; 4. Waal^{3}	3. Eggenthal; 1. Baisweil; 2. Eggenthal^{1}; 3. Friesenried; 4. Obergünzburg; 1. Günzach; 2. Obergünzburg^{1,3}; 3. Untrasried	5. Pforzen; 1. Irsee^{3}; 2. Pforzen^{1}; 3. Rieden; 6. Roßhaupten; 1. Rieden am Forggensee; 2. Roßhaupten^{1}	7. Seeg; 1. Eisenberg; 2. Hopferau; 3. Lengenwang; 4. Rückholz; 5. Seeg^{1}; 6. Wald; 8. Stötten am Auerberg; 1. Rettenbach am Auerberg; 2. Stötten^{1}	9. Unterthingau; 1. Görisried; 2. Kraftisried; 3. Unterthingau^{1,3}; 10. Westendorf; 1. Kaltental^{3}; 2. Oberostendorf; 3. Osterzell; 4. Stöttwang; 5. Westendorf^{1}
^{1}seat of the Verwaltungsgemeinschaft; ^{2}town; ^{3}Markt
