= Biessenhofen =

- Municipality
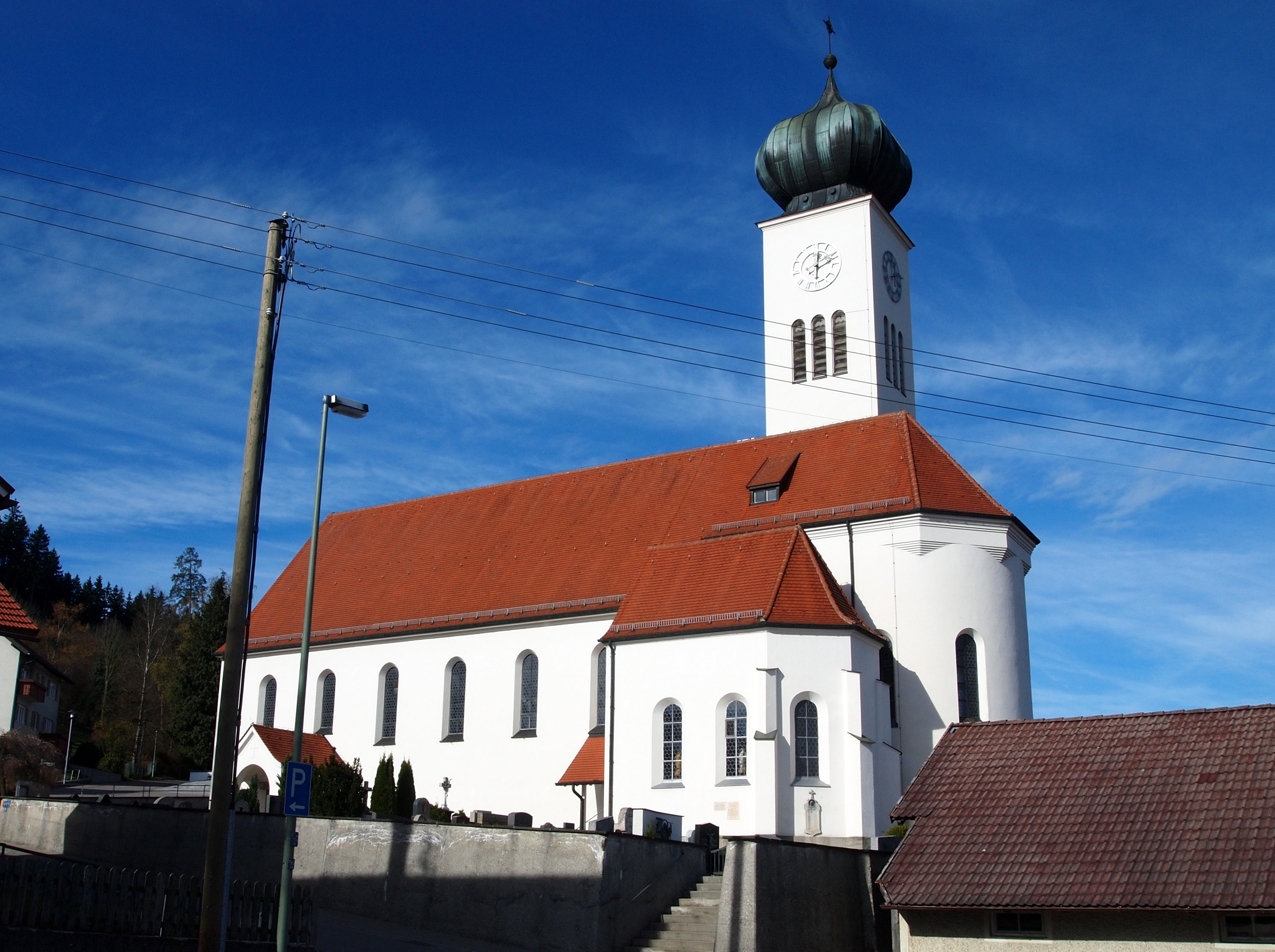
- Church of Saint George

- Coat of arms

- Location of Biessenhofen within Ostallgäu district
- Interactive map of Biessenhofen
- Location within Germany Location within Bavaria
- Coordinates: 47°50′N 10°38′E
- Country: Germany
- State: Bavaria
- Admin. region: Schwaben
- District: Ostallgäu
- Municipal assoc.: Biessenhofen

Government
  - Mayor (2020–26): Wolfgang Eurisch (CSU)

Area
  - Total: 27.01 km^{2} (10.43 sq mi)
- Elevation: 710 m (2,330 ft)

Population (2025-12-31)
  - Total: 4,258
  - Density: 157.6/km^{2} (408.3/sq mi)
- Time zone: UTC+01:00 (CET)
  - Summer (DST): UTC+02:00 (CEST)
- Postal codes: 87640
- Dialling codes: 08341
- Vehicle registration: OAL
- Website: www.biessenhofen.de

Biessenhofen (German pronunciation: [biːsn̩ˈhoːfn̩]) is a municipality in the district of Ostallgäu in Bavaria in Germany.
