= Mauerstetten =

- Municipality
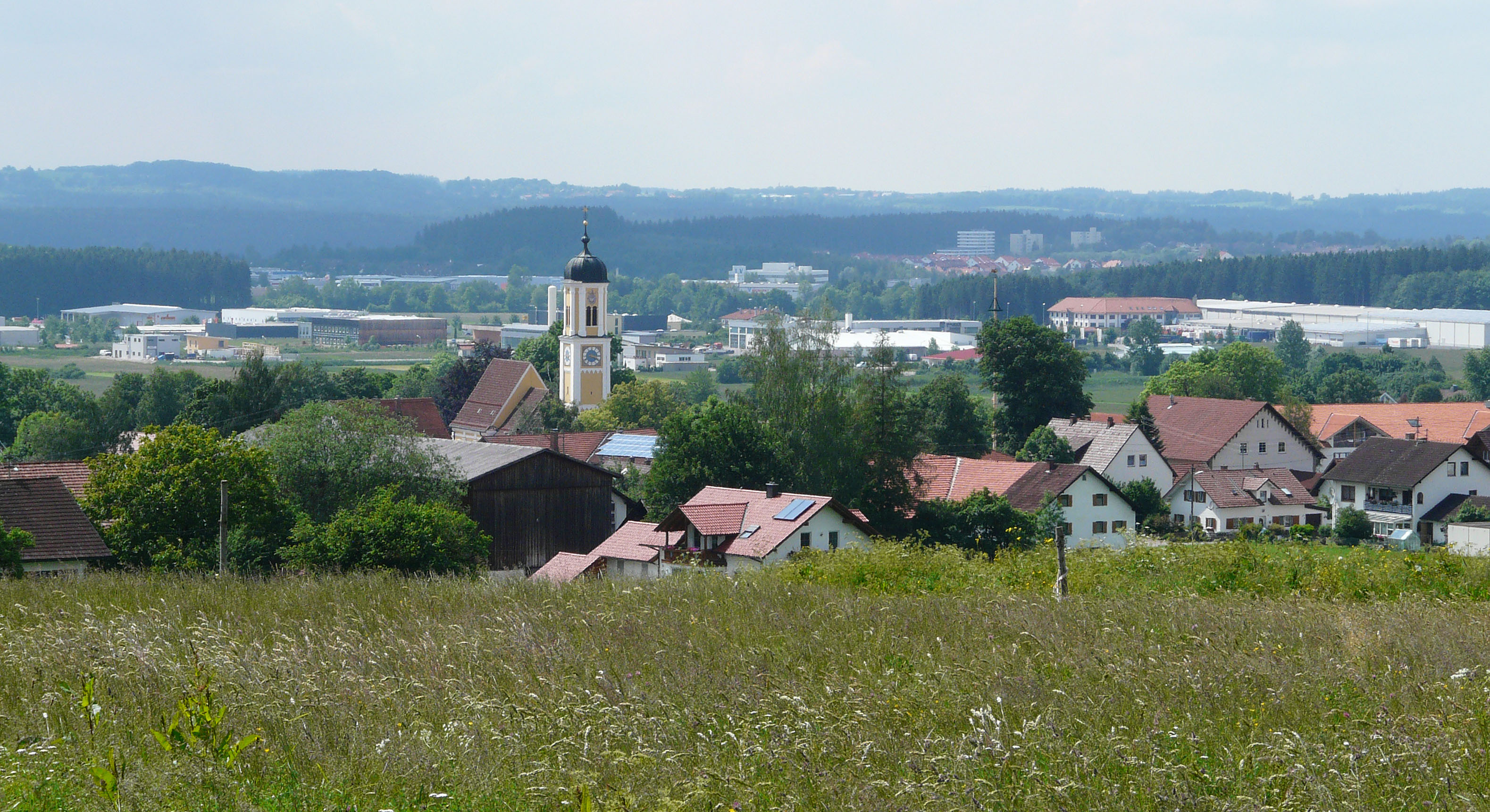
- Mauerstetten seen from the east

- Coat of arms

- Location of Mauerstetten within Ostallgäu district
- Interactive map of Mauerstetten
- Location within Germany Location within Bavaria
- Coordinates: 47°53′N 10°40′E
- Country: Germany
- State: Bavaria
- Admin. region: Schwaben
- District: Ostallgäu

Government
  - Mayor (2020–26): Armin Holderried

Area
  - Total: 16.57 km^{2} (6.40 sq mi)
- Elevation: 716 m (2,349 ft)

Population (2025-12-31)
  - Total: 3,258
  - Density: 196.6/km^{2} (509.2/sq mi)
- Time zone: UTC+01:00 (CET)
  - Summer (DST): UTC+02:00 (CEST)
- Postal codes: 87665
- Dialling codes: 08341
- Vehicle registration: OAL
- Website: www.mauerstetten.de

Mauerstetten (German pronunciation: [maʊɐˈʃtɛtn̩]) is a municipality in the district of Ostallgäu in the southwest of Bavaria in Germany.

Its foundations dates back to the early 9th century, and its name actually means "place of walls", due to ruins of supposedly Roman origin found there. Currently, Mauerstetten has about 2,800 inhabitants living in the four parts of the community: Mauerstetten itself, Steinholz, Hausen and Frankenried. Agriculture still plays a large role in the village, but some modest industry is to be found there as well.

The village has a primary school, a kindergarten, two banks (Sparkasse and RaiBa), a small grocery store, a bakery, and a small post office. In the center of Mauerstetten stands the church St. Vitus.

Mauerstetten is also known for its sport club which includes football, volleyball, tennis, etc.
