= Rückholz =

- Municipality
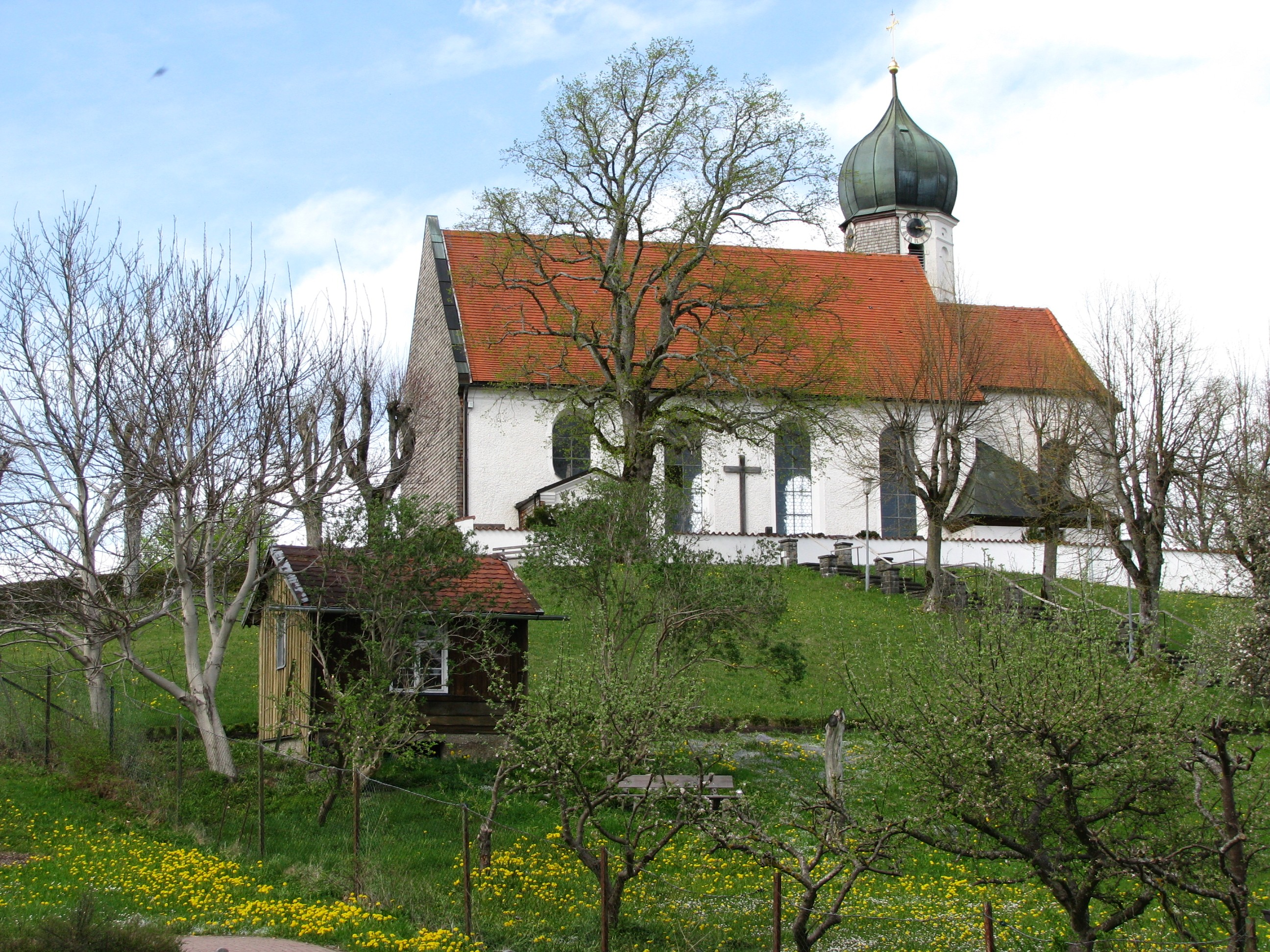
- Church of Saint George

- Coat of arms

- Location of Rückholz within Ostallgäu district
- Interactive map of Rückholz
- Location within Germany Location within Bavaria
- Coordinates: 47°40′N 10°33′E
- Country: Germany
- State: Bavaria
- Admin. region: Schwaben
- District: Ostallgäu
- Municipal assoc.: Seeg

Government
  - Mayor (2020–26): Franz Erl

Area
  - Total: 17.22 km^{2} (6.65 sq mi)
- Elevation: 879 m (2,884 ft)

Population (2025-12-31)
  - Total: 1,043
  - Density: 60.57/km^{2} (156.9/sq mi)
- Time zone: UTC+01:00 (CET)
  - Summer (DST): UTC+02:00 (CEST)
- Postal codes: 87494
- Dialling codes: 08364
- Vehicle registration: OAL
- Website: www.rueckholz.de

Rückholz (German pronunciation: [ˈʁʏkhɔlts]) is a municipality in the district of Ostallgäu in Bavaria in Germany.
