= Seeg =

- Municipality
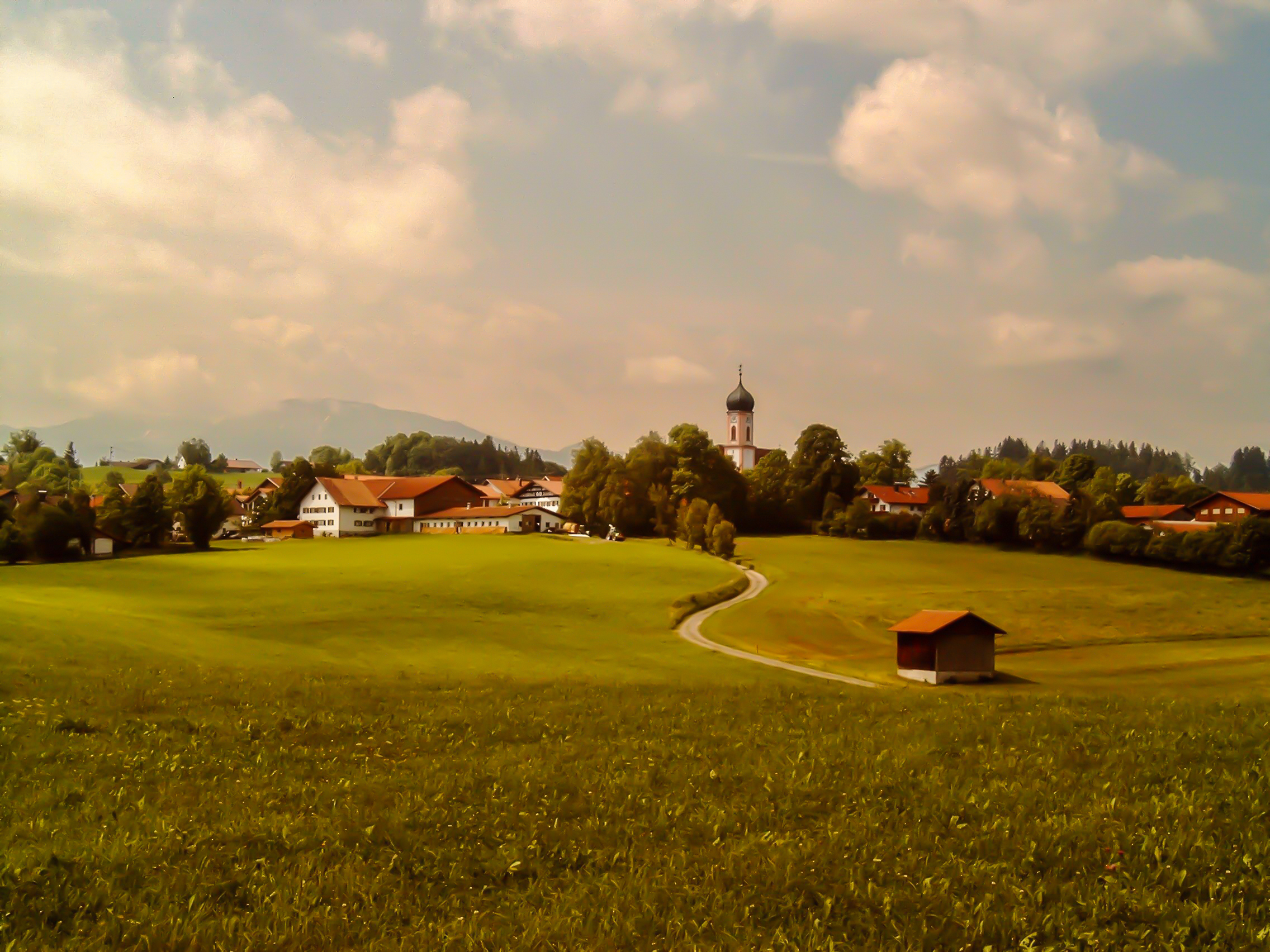
- Seeg, view to the village

- Coat of arms

- Location of Seeg within Ostallgäu district
- Interactive map of Seeg
- Location within Germany Location within Bavaria
- Coordinates: 47°39′N 10°36′E
- Country: Germany
- State: Bavaria
- Admin. region: Schwaben
- District: Ostallgäu
- Municipal assoc.: Seeg

Government
  - Mayor (2020–26): Markus Berktold

Area
  - Total: 50.04 km^{2} (19.32 sq mi)
- Elevation: 853 m (2,799 ft)

Population (2025-12-31)
  - Total: 3,076
  - Density: 61.47/km^{2} (159.2/sq mi)
- Time zone: UTC+01:00 (CET)
  - Summer (DST): UTC+02:00 (CEST)
- Postal codes: 87637
- Dialling codes: 08364
- Vehicle registration: OAL
- Website: www.seeg.de

Seeg (German pronunciation: [zeːk]) is a municipality in the district of Ostallgäu in Bavaria in Germany.

== Gallery ==
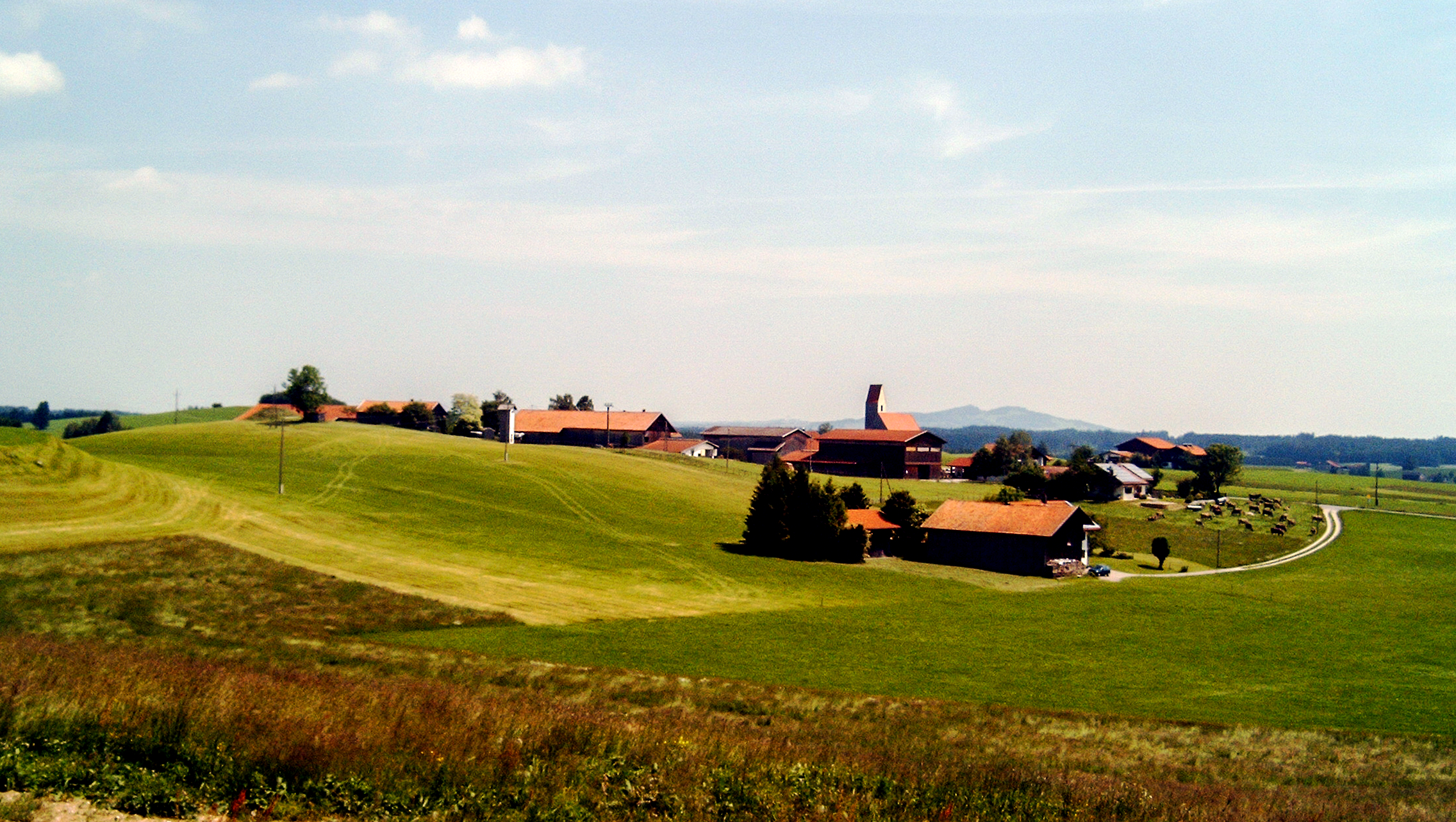
Kirchthal, view to the village

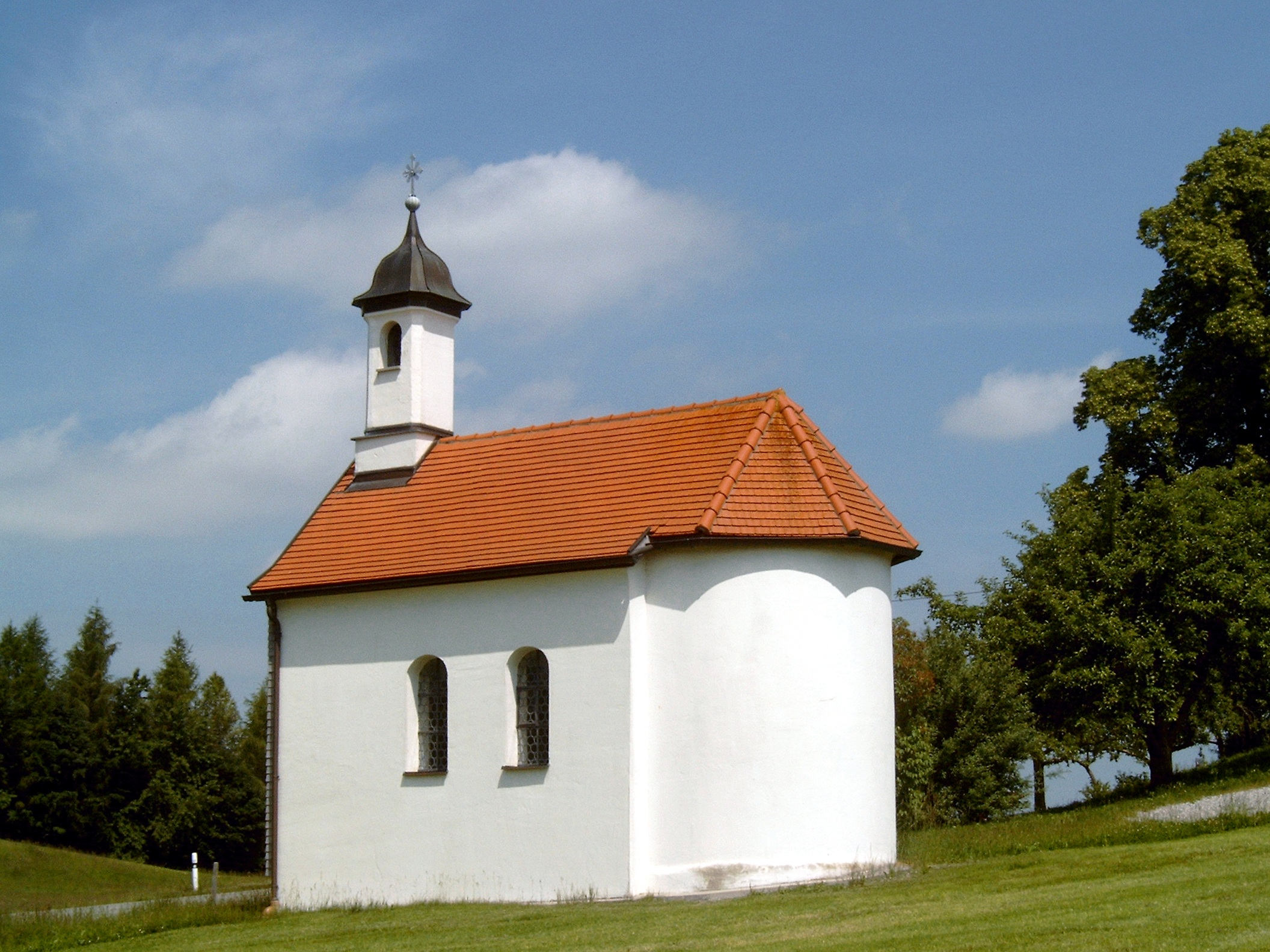
Engelbolz, chapel

== Notable people ==
- Irene Epple (1957), German alpine skier.
