= Bernd Hüttemann =

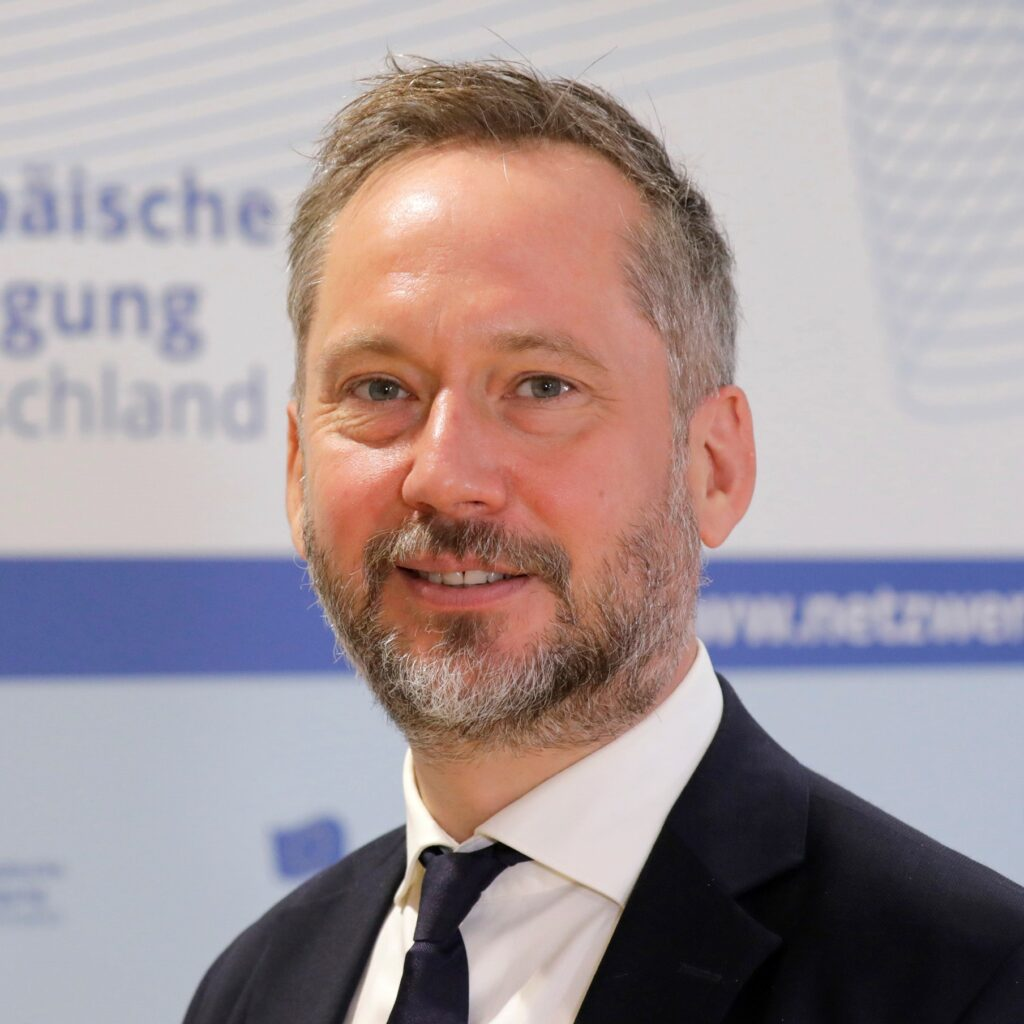
Hüttemann in 2021

Bernd Hüttemann (born December 8, 1970, in Paderborn) has been serving as Secretary-General of the European Movement Germany since 2003. Hüttemann is also a European policy advisor to the German Catholic Bishops' Conference and a lecturer at the Jean Monnet Chair of European Politics at the University of Passau.

== Education ==
Bernd Hüttemann attended the Gymnasium Theodorianum in Paderborn and studied political science, history, and European Law at the University of Bonn.

== Career ==
Since 2003, Hüttemann has been serving as full-time Secretary-General of the European Movement Germany (EBD), a civil society network in Berlin institutionally funded by the German Foreign Office. Simultaneously, he has been an adjunct professor at the University of Passau at the Joan Monnet Chair of European Politics since 2011. Furthermore, from 2015 to 2018, Hüttemann taught regularly at the Berlin School of Economics and Law.

In his previous professional positions, Hüttemann worked as a staff member at the Robert Bosch Stiftung, as a PR consultant, and as a research associate at the Institute for European Politics. From 2000 to 2003, he managed programs of the German Foreign Office on the EU pre-accession of Slovakia and Croatia, among others as an advisor to the Slovak government office in Bratislava.

== European politics ==
Hüttemann initially began his engagement in European politics with the Young European Federalists(JEF). In this context, he served as office manager in Bonn and Brussels, among other positions. Furthermore, from 2003 to 2013, Hüttemann was involved as honorary secretary-general for the Europa-Union Deutschland under Peter Altmaier. Between 2014 and 2020, he was Vice-President of the European Movement International.

In 2010, Bernd Hüttemann was named one of Germany's 160 best young executives under 40 by the business magazine Capital. The German radio station Deutschlandfunk describes him as a full-time lobbyist for the EU. Hüttemann's main areas of expertise include representing European interests, political communication, and coordinating European policy in Germany.

== Bibliography ==
- Bernd Hüttemann (2021). Werner Weidenfeld, Wolfgang Wessels (ed.). Interessenvertretung. Baden-Baden: Nomos Verl.-Ges. pp. 173–176. doi:10.5771/9783748912668. ISBN 978-3-8487-7252-0. S2CID 245940452.
- Bernd Hüttemann and Elena Sandmann (2020). Forschungsjournal Soziale Bewegungen (ed.). "Im Mittelfeld der Europapolitik: Zivilgesellschaft, Lobbyismus und Partizipative Demokratie im Mehrebenensystem der EU". Forschungsjournal Soziale Bewegungen. 32 (4): 557–569. doi:10.1515/fjsb-2019-0061. S2CID 211229338.
- Bernd Hüttemann (2021). Daniel Göler, Eckart Stratenschulte (ed.). Norm- und Regeltransfer in der europäischen Außenpolitik. Baden-Baden: Nomos Verl.-Ges. pp. 173–176. doi:10.5771/9783748912668. ISBN 978-3-8487-7252-0. S2CID 245940452.
- Bernd Hüttemann (2017). Werner Weidenfeld, Wolfgang Wessels (ed.). Lobbyismus in der partizipativen Demokratie. Baden-Baden: Nomos Verl.-Ges. pp. 193–196. doi:10.5771/9783845284897. ISBN 978-3-8487-4225-7.
- Bernd Hüttemann, "Tackling Populism In Europe With A New Form Of Public Diplomacy", Turkish Policy Quarterly, vol. Spring 2017, Istanbul
- Bernd Hüttemann (2015). "Das "Schwarze Loch" der deutschen Europapolitik Lobbyismus und europapolitische Koordinierung in Deutschland". In Daniel Göler; Alexandra Schmid; Lukas Zech (eds.). Das "Schwarze Loch" der deutschen Europapolitik – Lobbyismus und europapolitische Koordinierung in Deutschland. Baden-Baden: Nomos Verl.-Ges. pp. 175–195. doi:10.5771/9783845260570-174. ISBN 978-3-8487-1943-3.
- "Fondazioni ex-bancarie: Die Renaissance des italienischen Stiftungswesens". Stiftung & Sponsoring. 2000. pp. 29–30.
- Bernd Hüttemann and Ingo Linsenmann (2011). Wolfgang Wessels, Werner Weidenfeld (ed.). Europa im Internet. Baden-Baden: Nomos Verl.-Ges. pp. 460–466. ISBN 978-3-8252-3528-4.
- Bernd Hüttemann and Juraj Alner (2007). Wolfgang Wessels, Werner Weidenfeld (ed.). "Slowakei". Jahrbuch der Europäischen Integration. Baden-Baden: Nomos Verl.-Ges.
- Bernd Hüttemann und Thomas Traguth (2009). Tartu Ülikool Euroopa Kolledž (ed.). "Europeanisation. The Impact of Europe. What You See Is What You Do Not Get". EL Ajalooline Kujunemine Ja Euroopastumise Teooria. Tartu. hdl:10062/10287.
