= Langenthal (disambiguation) =

There are several municipalities and communities which have the name Langenthal:

== In Germany ==
- Langenthal, Rhineland-Palatinate, in the district of Bad Kreuznach, Rhineland-Palatinate
- Langenthal, Upper Palatinate, in the municipality of Berg, Upper Palatinate, Bavaria
- Langenthal, Swabia, in the municipality of Untrasried, Bavaria
- Langenthal, Kassel, in the municipality of Trendelburg, Hesse
- Langenthal, Bergstraße, in the municipality of Hirschhorn (Neckar), Hesse

== In Switzerland ==
- Langenthal, Switzerland, in the Canton of Bern
