= 1992 Baden-Württemberg state election =

State election in Germany

- 5 April 1992

All 146 seats in the Landtag of Baden-Württemberg 74 seats needed for a majority
- Turnout: 4,949,199 (70.1%) ▼1.7%
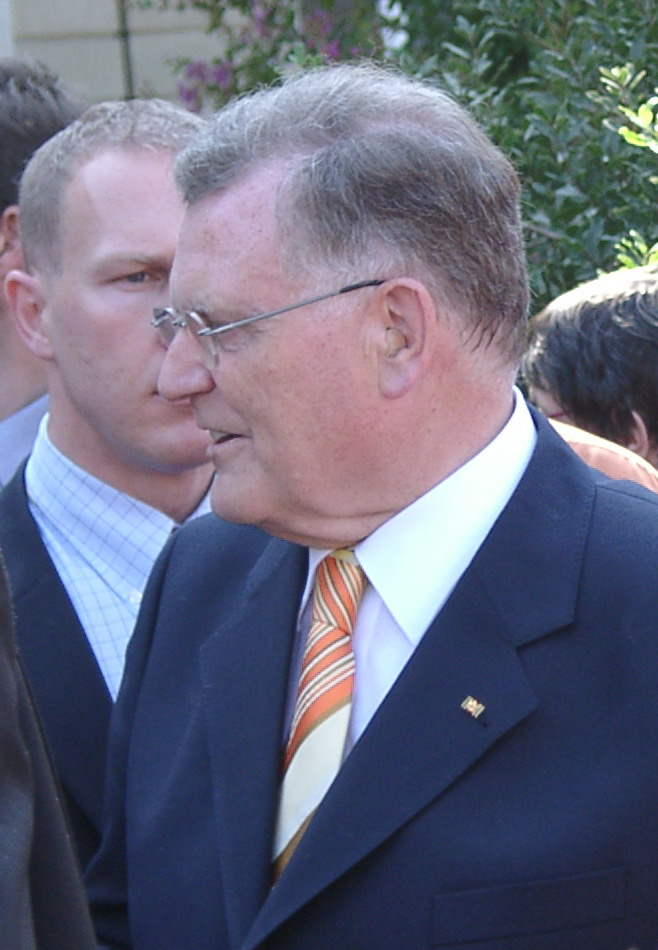

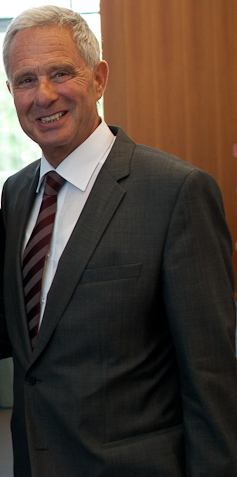
	First party	Second party	Third party
Leader	Erwin Teufel	Dieter Spöri	Rolf Schlierer
Party	CDU	SPD	REP
Last election	66 seats, 49.0%	42 seats, 32.0%	0 seats, 1.0%
Seats won	64	46	15
Seat change	▼2	▲4	▲15
Popular vote	1,960,016	1,454,477	539,014
Percentage	39.6%	29.4%	10.9%
Swing	▼9.4%	▼2.6%	▲9.9%
	Fourth party	Fifth party
Party	Greens	FDP
Last election	10 seats, 7.9%	7 seats, 5.9%
Seats won	13	8
Seat change	▲3	▲1
Popular vote	467,781	291,199
Percentage	9.5%	5.9%
Swing	▲1.6%	0.0%
- Results for the single-member constituencies.
Minister-President before election
Erwin Teufel
CDU
Elected Minister-President
Erwin Teufel
CDU

The 1992 Baden-Württemberg state election was held on 5 April 1992 to elect the members of the 10th Landtag of Baden-Württemberg. The incumbent Christian Democratic Union (CDU) government under Minister-President Erwin Teufel lost its majority. The CDU suffered a 9.4% swing, mostly to the national conservative Republicans, who managed to enter the Landtag due to the asylum debate and achieved their best result in a state election, placing third with 10.9%. After the election, the CDU formed a grand coalition with the Social Democratic Party (SPD), and Teufel was re-elected as Minister-President.

== Parties ==
The table below lists parties represented in the previous Landtag of Baden-Württemberg.

Name		Ideology	Leader(s)	1988 result	
Name		Ideology	Leader(s)	Votes (%)	Seats
CDU	Christian Democratic Union of Germany; Christlich Demokratische Union Deutschlands	Christian democracy	Erwin Teufel	49.0%	66 / 125
SPD	Social Democratic Party of Germany; Sozialdemokratische Partei Deutschlands	Social democracy	Dieter Spöri	32.0%	42 / 125
Grüne	The Greens; Die Grünen	Green politics		7.9%	10 / 125
FDP	Free Democratic Party; Freie Demokratische Partei	Classical liberalism		5.9%	7 / 125

== Results ==
Summary of the 5 April 1992 election results for the Landtag of Baden-Württemberg
Party	Votes	%	+/-	Seats	+/-	Seats %
Christian Democratic Union (CDU)	1,960,016	39.6	▼9.4	64	▼2	43.8
Social Democratic Party (SPD)	1,454,477	29.4	▼2.6	46	▲4	31.5
The Republicans (REP)	539,014	10.9	▲9.9	15	▲15	10.3
The Greens (Grüne)	467,781	9.5	▲1.6	13	▲3	8.9
Free Democratic Party (FDP)	291,199	5.9	0.0	8	▲1	5.5
Ecological Democratic Party (ÖDP)	93,604	1.9	▲0.5	0	±0	0
National Democratic Party (NPD)	44,416	0.9	▼1.2	0	±0	0
Others	64,247	2.0		0	±0	0
Total	4,949,199	100.0		146	▲21	
Voter turnout		70.1	▼1.7			

Popular Vote
CDU	39.60%
SPD	29.39%
REP	10.89%
GRÜNE	9.45%
FDP	5.88%
Other	4.78%

Landtag seats
CDU	43.84%
SPD	31.51%
REP	10.27%
GRÜNE	8.90%
FDP	5.48%

== Sources ==
- Ergebnisse der Landtagswahlen in Baden-Württemberg 1992
