= Rainer Wend =

German politician

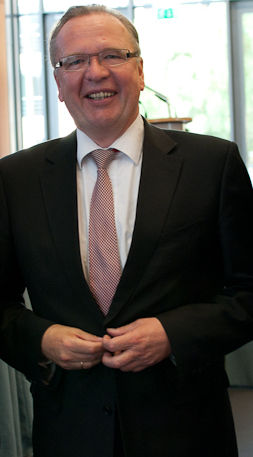
Wend in 2012

Rainer Wend (born 8 March 1954) is a German politician of the Social Democratic Party (SPD) and currently lobbyist for Deutsche Post DHL. From 2002 to 2005, he was chairman of the Bundestag-Committee Economics and Labour as well as spokesman of the SPD parliamentary party on Economic Affairs from 2005 till 2009. In July 2012, he was elected President of European Movement Germany.

== Work and life ==
Wend was born in Gütersloh. After graduating from high school, he started studying law which he successfully completed in 1979 with the first state examination. After his legal practical training he completed the second state examination and started his doctoral thesis at the Bielefeld University. Wend has been qualified as lawyer since 1984. Furthermore, he was curator of the New Social Market Economy Initiative.

Wend is married and has three daughters.

== Political career ==
Dr Rainer Wend has already been a member of the Social Democratic Party of Germany since 1980. Throughout his studies he had been actively engaged in the respective campus group and became Head of the Young Socialists in Ostwestfalen/Lippe and later on Head of the SPD district Bielefeld (1988-1998). From 1998 till 2008 he had been a member of German Bundestag. In 2002 he became chairmen of the Bundestag-Committee Economics and Labour and was named as spokesman of the SPD parliamentary party on Economic Affairs in 2008. In 2008 he did not run for the reelections anymore and became the Head of Corporate Public Policy and Sustainability at Deutsche Post DHL.

== European politics ==
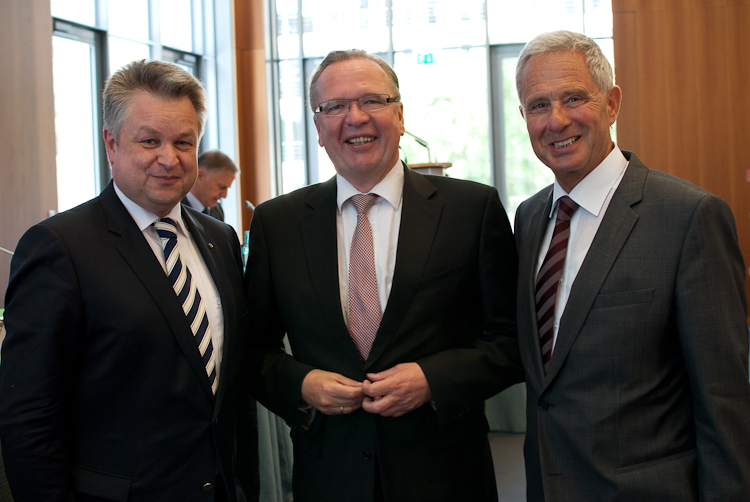
Wend (centre) with State Minister Michael Georg Link (left) and EBD's Honorary President Dieter Spöri (right)

Since Wend has been working for the Bundestag, his political priorities are related to financial and economical topics as well as to the euro-crisis. According to Wend important elements of crisis management are besides budget discipline and structural reforms in the affected countries a greater convergence of economic and financial policies of the EU members towards a “political union”. Wend supports the introduction of a financial transaction tax on a broad base. In the course of the debates on the Multiannual Financial Framework of the EU, Wend and his British counterpart call for a growth-oriented budget framework. Wend also represents the idea of a social Europe, as a political union only can succeed if the living conditions within Europe are comparable. From July 2012 to 2018, Wend has been president of EM Germany following SPD politician Dieter Spöri and being succeeded by Linn Selle.

== Public office ==
From 1994 until 2003, he was mayor of Bielefeld.
