= European Movement Germany =

Non-partisan network of interest groups in the field of EU politics in Germany

Network European Movement Germany Netzwerk Europäische Bewegung Deutschland e. V.
- Founded: 1949
- Founder: Duncan Sandys, Eugen Kogon, Paul Löbe
- Purpose: European policy, Political communication, Civil society
- Location: Berlin
- Region served: Germany
- Method: Cooperation
- Members: 250 (2023)
- Key people: Linn Selle (president), Micheal Gahler, Christian Petry, Barbara Lochbihler, Peter Hahn, Bernd Hüttemann
- Employees: 10
- Website: netzwerk-ebd.de

European Movement Germany (EM Germany) is a non-partisan network of interest groups in the field of EU politics in Germany. It cooperates closely with all EU stakeholders on a national and European level, most particularly with the German Federal Government and the European Commission. The EM Germany network consists of 250 member organisations representing various social groups including business and professional associations, trade unions, educational and academic institutions, foundations and political parties, amongst others. The network aims to continually improve, in close cooperation with political institutions, communication on European politics, European perspectives and the coordination of European policy, all in close cooperation with political institutions. The EM Germany network is a member of European Movement International.

== Activities, projects and policy ==
European Movement Germany is a not-for-profit, registered organisation, recognised and supported by the Department of Foreign Affairs and by the federal budget at institutional level. EM Germany is therefore not a non-governmental organisation in the narrow sense. Its legal status and institutional relationship to the Foreign Office is similar to the Goethe Institute. In 2015, EM Germany came to a framework agreement with the German Foreign Office. The organisation works closely with the European Division of the Foreign Office as regards content and organisation. Following the European Division, certain concepts of European communication and policy-planning were adopted. Within this framework, EM Germany provides information sessions on European topics to its member organisations. Topics range from discussions of the commission's consultation procedure to information events on the decisions of the European Council.

EM Germany is further responsible for choosing running the application process for German students who wish to apply for scholarships to the College of Europe in Bruges and Natolin. In addition, the EM Germany organises the European Competition, a student competition in which students of all ages submit creative, artistic, or written pieces of work on the activities of the European Union.

The main activities of the EM Germany include commenting on the regulatory framework of German European policy, European Public Relations and posing general questions on the development of the European Union.

== Cooperation with other organisations ==
The network differs from the Europa-Union Deutschland or the Paneuropean Union in that it is not open to private membership. EM Germany works primarily to improve the acceptance and the regulatory framework of European policy in Germany and avoids activities that could be better undertaken by its member organisations. The network works in an advisory capacity with representatives of the federal states on the coordination of European public relations in the German federal level, in the European Parliament, and the Commission. Together with its institutional partner, the Foreign Office, EM Germany promotes dialogue by organising events. Target groups include EU stakeholders, the federal government, the states, regions, and civil society.

Due to the multitude of EBD De-Briefings and EU analysis on important European developments, EM Germany has intensified its cooperation with its member organisations, the European Commission Representation in Germany, and other ministries. In 2009 the network was awarded the "Euractiv Award for Debating Europe Nationally".

== Structure ==
The bodies of the European Movement Germany are composed as follows: the Annual General Meeting (AGM), the executive board, and the secretary general. The AGM convenes once a year. Each member organisation has one vote in the meeting. The board of directors leads the activities of the association and reflects the different areas of activity of the members: business, trade unions, education and science, political parties, and others. In June 2018, Dr. Linn Selle was elected president of the board. Current vice-presidents are Michael Gahler, MEP; Christian Petry MdB and Barbara Lochbihler MdB. The treasurer is Peter Hahn.

Bernd Hüttemann has been secretary-general of the EM Germany since 2003.

Honorary presidents are: Hans-Dietrich Genscher, former Federal Foreign Minister; Philipp Jenniger, former President of the Bundestag; Annemarie Renger, former President of the Bundestag; Walter Scheel, former German President; Dr Dieter Spöri, Rita Süssmuth, former President of the Bundestag; Wolfgang Thierse, former President of the Bundestag; Monika Wulf-Mathies, former EU Commissioner.

Furthermore, EM Germany is represented on the board of EM International.

== History ==
EM Germany was founded as part of European Movement International on 13 June 1949. Former Reichstag President Paul Löbe was the founding President and held this position until 1954.

=== Early years ===
Although thoughts of a united Europe were already centuries old, the notion became concrete in the aftermath of the Second World War. Winston Churchill's famous speech in Zürich in September 1946 was highly influential in this regard. In this speech, he advocated a new order in Europe; one of cooperation between the independent states of Europe. His son-in-law, Duncan Sandys, took on this idea. As the leader of the United Europe Movement he organised the Hague Congress of the European Movement. The objective of this Congress was to establish National Councils which would then join an International Council of European Movement on a European level. Significantly, Eugen Kogon, President of Europa-Union from 1949, supported the establishment of the German Council of the European Movement by inviting, along with Sandys, approximately 90 public figures in January 1949 to set up a provisional Executive Committee. On 13 June 1949 the German Council of the European Movement was founded in Wiesbaden. At the inaugural meeting, 252 highly regarded members were chosen from political parties, as well as from various strands of West German society. Former President of the Reichstag Paul Löbe was the founding President and held this office until 1954. Eugen Kogon took on the role of chairman of the executive committee of the German Council. His deputy was Hermann Brill. Among the members were also Konrad Adenauer, Ludwig Erhard and Theodore Heuss.

After the first meeting of the German Parliament, the German parliamentary section of the German Council was created on 9 November 1949. Carlo Schmid became its chairman; having previously been elected as vice-president of the International Parliamentary Group of European Movement. The deputy chairman of this section, which by 1950 had 244 members of parliament, was Heinrich von Brentano. The Secretary was Fritz Erler.

At its inception, the European Movement possessed a non-partisan character. The work of the German Council was financed through public funding, through State grants in the first months and, from 1950 onwards, by the Federal Chancellery.

=== Growth in activities and reforms ===
A more defined role for the German Council slowly became apparent. The executive committee under the leadership of Eugen Kogons met regularly and made statements on European policy, particularly in the areas of business, social policy, justice, and culture, as well as offering suggestions on the Government's coordination of European policy. The foundation of the European Cultural Centre in Geneva and the College of Europe in Bruges resulted in some new tasks for the German Council – namely the scholarship selection process for the college. The German Council also organised "European Schoolday", first held in 1953, but renamed in 1978 as The European Competition, in which students are asked to acquaint themselves with the concept of European integration. Above all, the German Council tried to mobilise the German public by taking part in International Congresses. It also carried out opinion polls, demonstrations and published information for members and the media.

Although European integration was advanced by the establishment of the European Coal and Steel Community in 1951 and the signing of the Treaty of Rome to establish the European Economic Community (EEC) and Euratom in 1957, significant disagreement concerning the future of Europe remained, both between the National Councils and within the German Council itself. One controversial issue was the necessity of a European Constitution, for example.

The lack of transparency in the leadership of Kogon led to his replacement as president in 1954 by Ernst Friedlaender, who reformed the organisational structure of the German National Council. Friedlaender subsequently fell ill and vacated his post in 1958. Hans Furler was chosen as his successor.

=== The 1960s and 1970s dominated by direct elections to the European Parliament ===
During the 1960s the Europa-Union and the German National Council boosted their impact by establishing a joint press office. Throughout this period, direct elections to the Parliament and an extension of Parliament competencies were promoted so that government action could more accurately reflect the wishes of the public. The second half of the 1970s was dominated by direct elections scheduled for 1979 and saw increased activity in public relations which focused on encouraging voter turnout and providing information regarding party political groupings on a European level. Meanwhile, the number of member organisations of the German Council steadily increased and regional organisations were established. Today European Movement Germany boasts 14 regional committees.

=== Overcoming the "Eurosclerosis" of the 1980s ===
Although the number of member organisations was growing, the German Council was increasingly faced with financial problems. This meant that the information service had to be discontinued. However the tried and tested structures that were already created for the preparation of the first direct elections to the European Parliament were subsequently retained so that they could be utilised for further elections.

The 1980s were characterised by a self-conscious Eurosclerosis, triggered by controversies over agricultural subsidies and the EU budget. This further hindered the activities of the German Council. The crisis was overcome with the adoption of the Single European Act (1987) followed by Treaty amendments of Maastricht (1993) and Amsterdam (1999). In this context the Federal Government and the German National Council worked even more closely to promote the discussion of, and the dissemination of information about, current political questions concerning Europe.

=== Advances in the last 20 years ===
In the 1990s, the name of the organisation was aligned with other national sections of European Movement International so that the German Council was henceforth known as European Movement Germany (EM Germany).

The organisation's education and media work was strengthened through debates about the economy and monetary union, the Constitutional Treaty and eastern enlargement, for which EM Germany served as a forum. In particular, EM Germany influenced the work of the Constitutional Convention, thanks to a study group formed in conjunction with Europa-Union. It also presented policy documents concerning an improvement of the capacity to act and the legitimation of the EU to the President of the Convention Valéry Giscard d'Estaing. From 2004, it's specialist work on the EU was further expanded through the development of a work programme on Europe-Communication and the European perspective. The best-known EM Germany projects include the regular EBD De-Briefings and EBD Briefings.

The Berlin office was opened in the late 1990s and has since become EM Germany's headquarters. Since 2022 the office can be found in Alt-Moabit in Berlin-Mitte.

In 2006 the Articles of Association were substantially remodelled so that every member organisation would have a vote at the Annual General Meeting and would pay an annual subscription. The range of member organisations has also become increasingly diverse. In 2014 EM Germany celebrated its 65th anniversary, and in 2010 EM Germany reached a record membership level of 202 organisations. In just seven years the organisation has accumulated over 70 new memberships. To accommodate new members more efficiently, the Board of Directors now decides on the admission of new members. The 2010 AGM decided to dedicate themselves to "Good Governance" in the EU and on German EU-stakeholders. The work programme for 2010/11 stressed that the position of stakeholders and civil society in the Lisbon Treaty was a new concept that needed to be addressed.

EM Germany holds a bi-annual survey. On the occasion of each European Council Presidency, possible topics for this survey will be obtained from the member organisations.

== Presidents since 1949 ==
- Paul Löbe, President of the Bundestag, President 1949–1951
- Eugen Kogon, 1951–1953
- Ernst Friedlaender, 1954–1958
- Hans Furler, 1958–1966
- Ernst Majonica, 1966–1976
- Horst Seefeld, former MEP, 1976–1980
- Walter Scheel, former President of the Bundestag, 1980–1985
- Philipp Jenninger, former President of the Bundestag, 1985–1990
- Annemarie Renger, former President of the Bundestag, 1990–1992
- Hans-Dietrich Genscher, former Minister for Foreign Affairs, 1992–1994
- Rita Süssmuth, former President of the Bundestag, 1994–1998
- Wolfgang Thierse, former President of the Bundestag, 1998–2000
- Monika Wulf-Mathies, former EU Commissioner, 2000–2006
- Dieter Spöri, former Minister, 2006–2012
- Rainer Wend, 2012–2018
- Linn Selle, since 2018

== General Secretaries since 1949 ==
- Walter Hummelsheim, 1949–1952
- Ernst Günter Focke, 1952–1961
- Berthold Finkelstein, 1961–1963
- Karlheinz Koppe, 1963–1970
- Gerhard Eickhorn, 1970–1991
- Horst Brauner, 1991–1994
- Hartmut Marhold, 1994–2002
- Axel Schäfer, 2002–2003
- Bernd Hüttemann, since 2003

== Other prominent members ==
- Elly Heuss-Knapp, politician, Vice-president 1949
- Carlo Schmid, politician, Vice-president 1949

== Member organisations ==
EM Germany currently consists of 250 member organisations. The Board of Directors decides upon new members.

== See also ==
- European Movement International

== Literature ==
- Adriana Lettrari: Brüssel in Berlin (er)leben. In: Zeitschrift für Politikberatung. Nr. 1, VS Verlag für Sozialwissenschaften, Wiesbaden 2010, ISSN 1865-4789, S. 69–73
- Wilfried Loth: Das Europa der Verbände: Die Europa-Union im europäischen Integrationsprozess (1949–1969). In: Jürgen Mittag/Wolfgang Wessels (Hrsg.): „Der Kölsche Europäer“ – Friedrich Carl von Oppenheim und die Europäische Einigung. Aschendorff Verlag, Münster 2005
- Europäische Bewegung Deutschland (Hrsg.): Festschrift „60 Jahre Europäische Bewegung Deutschland“. Berlin 2009
- Europäische Bewegung Deutschland (Hrsg.): "Carlo Schmid: Deutschland und der europäische Rat | Neuauflage zum 65. Geburtstag der EBD". Berlin 2014 (PDF)
