= 1988 Baden-Württemberg state election =

State election in Germany

- 20 March 1988

All 125 seats in the Landtag of Baden-Württemberg 63 seats needed for a majority
- Turnout: 4,933,846 (71.79%) ▲0.07%
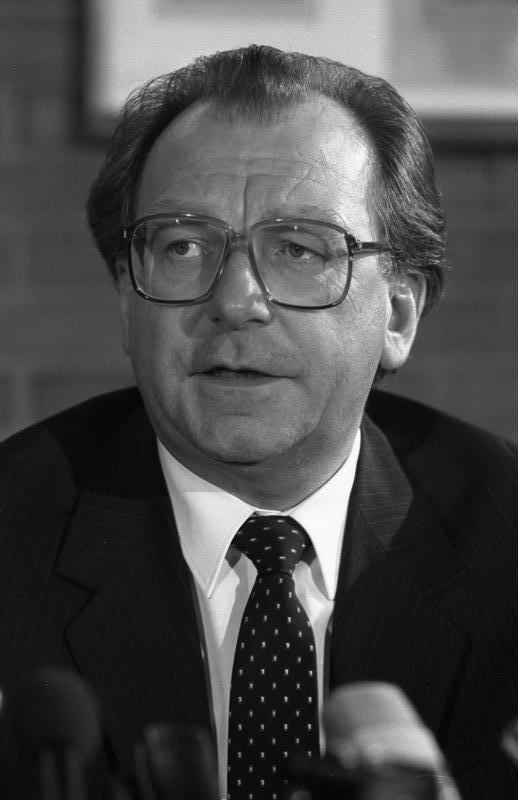

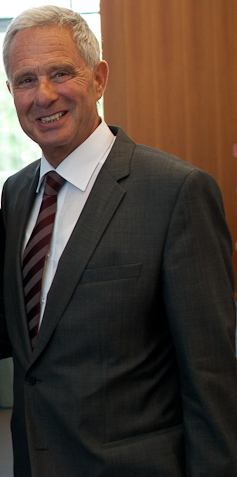

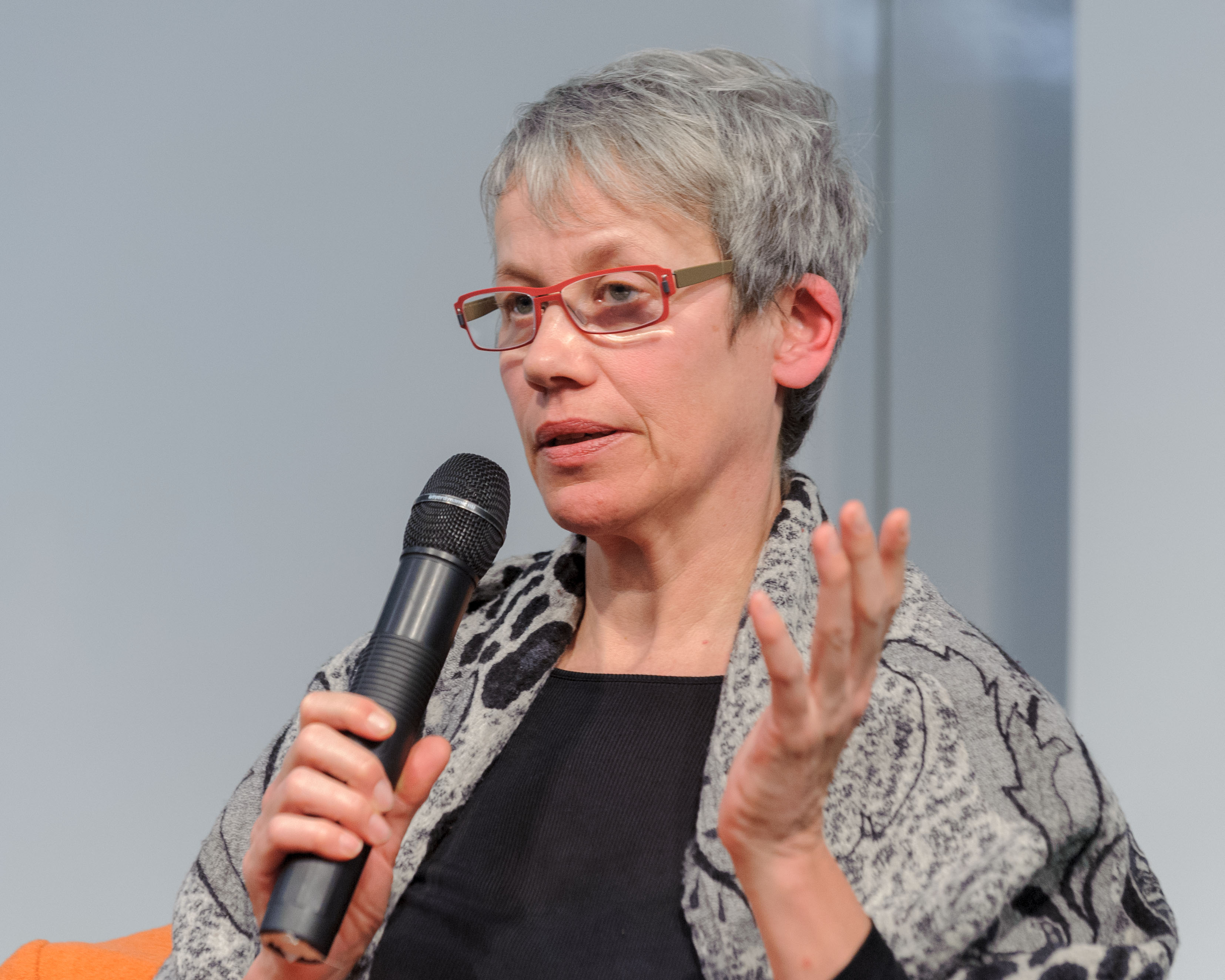

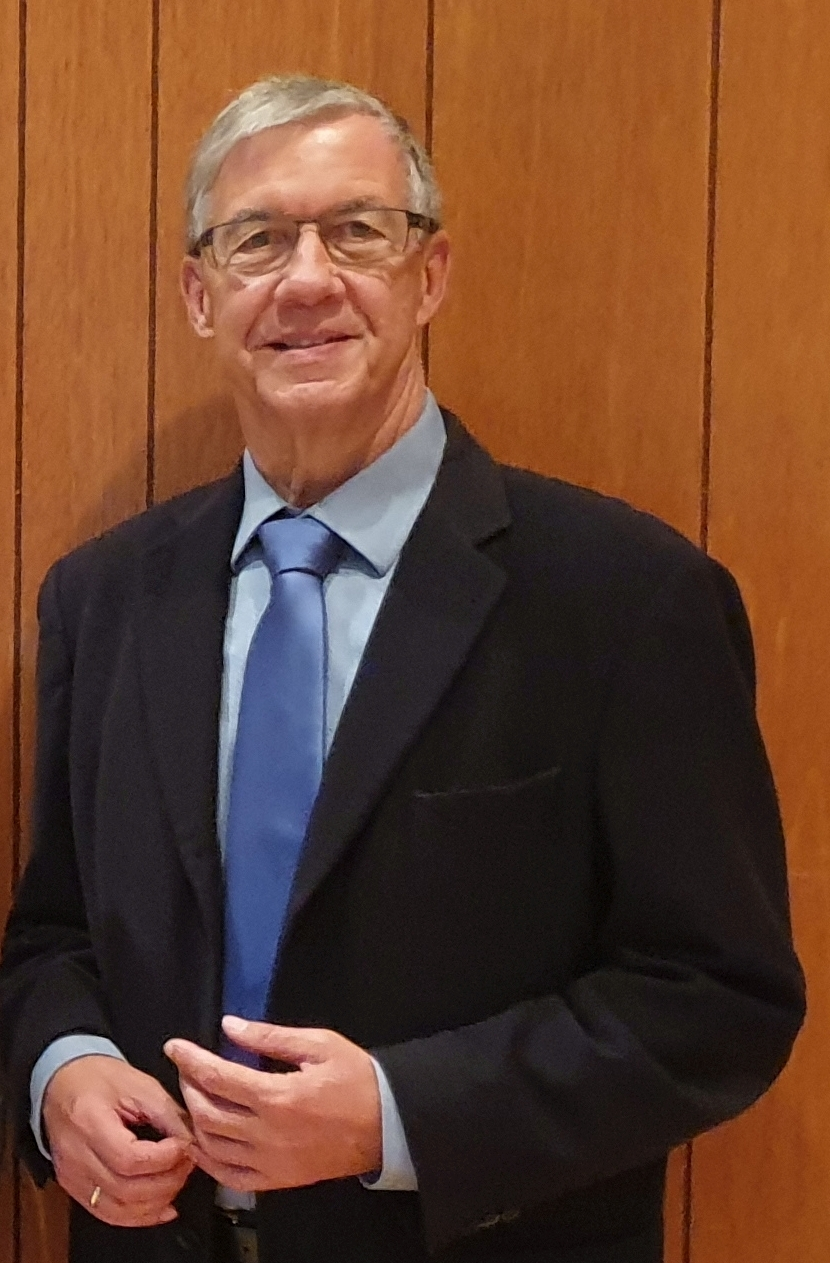
	First party	Second party	Third party
Leader	Lothar Späth	Dieter Spöri	Birgitt Bender
Party	CDU	SPD	Greens
Last election	68 seats, 51.87%	41 seats, 32.41%	9 seats, 8.01%
Seats won	66	42	10
Seat change	▼2	▲1	▲1
Popular vote	2,392,626	1,562,678	383,099
Percentage	49.05%	32.05%	7.85%
Swing	▼2.82%	▼0.36%	▼0.16%
	Fourth party
Leader	Walter Döring
Party	FDP
Last election	8 seats, 7.17%
Seats won	7
Seat change	▼1
Popular vote	285,932
Percentage	5.86%
Swing	▼1.31%
- Results for the single-member constituencies
Minister-President before election
Lothar Späth
CDU
Elected Minister-President
Lothar Späth
CDU

The 1988 Baden-Württemberg state election was held on 20 March 1988 to elect the members of the 9th Landtag of Baden-Württemberg. The incumbent Christian Democratic Union (CDU) government under Minister-President Lothar Späth was re-elected, retaining its majority. The overall results were not significantly different from the 1984 Baden-Württemberg state election, although all four major parties received a smaller proportion of the vote.

== Parties ==
The table below lists parties represented in the previous Landtag of Baden-Württemberg.

Name		Ideology	Leader(s)	1984 result	
Name		Ideology	Leader(s)	Votes (%)	Seats
CDU	Christian Democratic Union of Germany; Christlich Demokratische Union Deutschlands	Christian democracy	Lothar Späth	51.87%	68 / 126
SPD	Social Democratic Party of Germany; Sozialdemokratische Partei Deutschlands	Social democracy	Dieter Spöri	32.41%	41 / 126
Grüne	The Greens; Die Grünen	Green politics	Birgitt Bender	8.01%	9 / 126
FDP	Free Democratic Party; Freie Demokratische Partei	Classical liberalism	Walter Döring	7.17%	8 / 126

== Results ==
Summary of the 20 March 1988 election results for the Landtag of Baden-Württemberg
Party	Votes	%	+/-	Seats	+/-	Seats %
Christian Democratic Union (CDU)	2,392,626	49.05	▼2.82	66	▼2	52.80
Social Democratic Party (SPD)	1,562,678	32.05	▼0.36	42	▲1	33.60
The Greens (Grüne)	383,099	7.85	▼0.16	10	▲1	8.00
Free Democratic Party (FDP)	285,932	5.86	▼1.31	7	▼1	5.60
National Democratic Party (NPD)	101,889	2.09	New	0	±0	0
Ecological Democratic Party (ÖDP)	69,823	1.43	New	0	±0	0
The Republicans (REP)	46,904	0.96	New	0	±0	0
German Communist Party (DKP)	11,406	0.23	▼0.06	0	±0	0
Christian League	6,651	0.14	New	0	±0	0
Patriots for Germany	4,757	0.10	New	0	±0	0
Centre Party	1,185	0.02	New	0	±0	0
Free German Workers' Party	54	0.00	0.00	0	±0	0
Total	4,878,062	98.87		125	▼1	
Invalid votes	55,784	1.13				
Voter turnout	4,949,199	71.79	▲0.07			

== Sources ==
- Ergebnisse der Landtagswahlen in Baden-Württemberg 1992
