= Europa-Union Deutschland =

Non-governmental organization

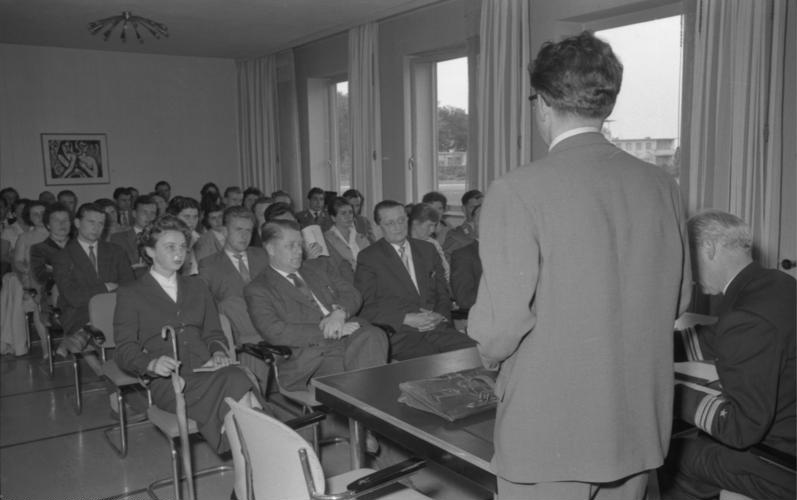
- Formation: 1946
- Type: Advocacy group
- Purpose: Advocate federalism
- Headquarters: Berlin, Germany
- President: Rainer Wieland
- Website: www.europa-union.de

Europa-Union Deutschland e.V. (EUD) is the German section of the Union of European Federalists (UEF). It is a non-partisan, interdenominational and independent non-governmental organization advocating federal Europe. EUD's youth organization, Junge Europäische Föderalisten Deutschland is part of the Young European Federalists.

== Self-conception ==
Europa-Union Deutschland is a citizens' initiative based on volunteerism and active citizenship. EUD is operating on local, regional and national level and unites representatives of all social groups. EUD advocates a far-reaching European Integration. As a mediator between citizens and institutions of the European polity it has been fighting for "a citizens' Europe" based on social consensus.

EUD's founding idea was the establishment of democratic and federal structures to enable the cooperation of the European peoples. Important stages of European integration were demanded by Europa-Union Deutschland at an early stage: direct election of the European Parliament, democratization of the European Community/Union, enlargement, introduction of the euro. EUD regularly takes a stand on specific policy areas, particularly concerning a citizens' Europe.

In line with the demand for a United States of Europe EUD fought for a European constitution and supported reform processes such as the failed Constitutional Treaty and the successful Treaty of Lisbon. The federalist attitude was confirmed by the organization in December 2009 with the criticism of the Federal Constitutional Court of Germany. Europa-Union Deutschland organizes lectures in schools and associations as well as conferences, weekend seminars and study tours to European institutions in order to make European Integration more known amongst citizens.

== History ==
=== Founding Years 1946-1949 ===
In September 1946, the Swiss "Europa-Union" invited the European Federalists for a conference to Hertenstein close to Lake Lucerne.

Twelve theses were formulated constituting the foundation of the European federalists' work in the post-war years. The theses became known as Hertenstein Program and later became the founding document of Europa-Union Deutschland.

At the same time in Zurich, Winston Churchill held a plea for a united Europe. The Hertenstein conference was followed by two more in Luxembourg and Basel. In December 1946 the Union of European Federalists (UEF) was founded in Paris, with Italians, French and Dutch being particularly well represented. According to a euro-skeptic British source, until the 1960s, the UEF was financed in part by the American Committee for a United Europe (ACUE), which was directed by the Office of Strategic Services (OSS), the former U.S. Secret Service.

Invitations to UEF events were also sent to Germans, but they could not participate because they were not allowed to travel by the authorities of the occupied zones in the period after the Second World War. The only exception were Germans living in exile in Switzerland, such as Heinrich Ritzel, a former SPD deputy in the Reichstag. Ritzel was Secretary General of the Swiss Europa-Union in 1939. In several places in the Western occupation zones - especially in the British zone - groups were formed during this period, all of which had the unification of Europe as their goal, but initially had little contact with each other.

With the help of Dutch and British participants of the Hertenstein meeting, Heinrich Ritzel managed to get in touch with Wilhelm Heile, district administrator of the town Syke close to Bremen. Already during the times of the Weimar Republic Heile had founded an "association for European cooperation". Together with the manufacturer Wilhelm Hermes from Mönchengladbach Heile initiated on 9 December 1946 a merger of Germany's most important European groups. In line with the Swiss Europa-Union, Ritze suggested the name Europa-Union also for the German "Europeans". Heile became the first chairman and Hermes became CEO of the new Europa-Union Deutschland. A secretariat was established in Mönchengladbach.

EUD's first rallies were organized in Duisburg, Cologne, Kiel and Lübeck. In the Soviet occupation zone all activities of Europa-Union and other West-oriented pro-European organizations were banned. The first EUD Congress took place in Eutin in 1947. It was attended by 200 delegates from 50 regional groups. In November 1947, after the accession of further new federal groups, Europa-Union became the German section of the UEF.

Chaired by Winston Churchill, a "Europe-Congress" was convoked in The Hague on 7 May 1948. It was attended by more than 700 politicians from the beneficiary countries of the Marshall Plan. The congress had been prepared by the UEF and financed by the ACUE. The most important results were the formation of the Council of Europe and the establishment of the European Movement.

In 1949, the "German Council of the European Movement", which is now the European Movement Germany, was founded in Wiesbaden. Europa-Union Deutschland is member of the European Movement Germany.

=== 1949–1954 ===
Following the EUD Congress in Eutin another congress took place in Hamburg in May 1949. The publicist Eugen Kogon was elected first president during the Hamburg congress. Carlo Schmid was in absence elected vice-president and henceforth was an important advisor for Europa-Union Deutschland. Under the leadership of Kogon EUD represented the ideological interests and opinions of German left-wing Catholicism and French integral federalism in the late 1940s and early 1950s. The unification of Europe should be achieved bypassing parliaments. In the following years, criticism arose concerning Kogon's leadership style and the political orientation of Europa-Union. In addition, his financial mismanagement, which brought the association to the brink of ruin in the early 1950s, provided the grounds for his dismissal.

CDU MP Paul Leverkuehn was elected new president in a crucial vote against Franz Josef Strauss during the EUD Congress in Cologne on 2 May 1954. However, after a serious car accident and hostilities because of his intelligence work during World War II he had to resign in September 1954.

=== 1954–1978 ===
In the presidential elections at the congress in Hanover in October 1954, Ernst Friedländer emerged as victor after the opposition candidate Kurt Georg Kiesinger had withdrawn his candidacy. After the failure of the European Defence Community in 1954 and the massive decline in membership, the goal of becoming a mass organization was dropped. Instead, the association focused on the systematic manipulation of government bureaucracy and political parties. EUD supported and encouraged Germany's integration with the West. Friedländer was assisted by the Cologne-based banker Friedrich Carl von Oppenheim, who could ensure, through his contacts in the financial world, the economic survival of Europa-Union Deutschland.

When Friedländer resigned for health reasons, Oppenheim was elected president in Bremen in mid-January 1958. During this time, the secretariat was moved from Frankfurt to Bonn in order to develop closer ties to federal political actors and to increase influence on German foreign and European policies. Good relations existed with Chancellor Adenauer and in particular with the Foreign Office, which supported Europa-Union Deutschland financially. The positions of the organization during Friedländer's and Oppenheim's presidency were diametrically opposed to Kogon's views. First, a clear choice was made to support an Atlantic- and West-oriented Europe. Second, special emphasis was put on economic issues. Third, Europa-Union clearly committed itself to the free democratic basic order of the Federal Republic.

=== Presidents since 1949 ===
- 1949–1954: Eugen Kogon
- 1954: Paul Leverkuehn
- 1954–1957: Ernst Friedländer
- 1957–1973: Friedrich Carl von Oppenheim
- 1973–1980: Theo M. Loch
- 1980–1989: Walter Scheel, former President of Germany
- 1989–1997: Egon Klepsch, former President of the European Parliament
- 1997–1999: Hans-Gert Pöttering, former President of the European Parliament
- 1999–2006: Elmar Brok MEP
- 2006-2011: Peter Altmaier MP
- since 2011: Rainer Wieland MEP

=== Secretaries General ===
- 1946: Wilhelm Hermes
- 1948: Erich Roßmann
- Hans-Joachim Unger
- 1956: Carl-Heinz Lüders
- 1958-1966: Helmut Müller
- Gerhard Eickhorn
- Hans Peters
- Wolfgang Wessels
- Hartmut Marhold
- 2002: Axel Schäfer
- 2003: Bernd Hüttemann
- seit 2011: Christian Moos

== Parliamentary Work ==
Since 2006, Europa-Union Deutschland has increasingly focused on parliamentary work. 70 members of the European Parliament and 108 members of the German Parliament are EUD-members. The boards of the parliamentary groups comprise members of different German parties.

Europa-Union Parliamentary Group German Bundestag: Chairman: MP Manuel Sarrazin, The Greens; Deputy Chairpersons: MP Michael Link, FDP; MP Eva Högl, SPD; MP Günter Krings, CDU.

Europa-Union Parliamentary Group European Parliament: Chairman: Matthias Groote, SPD/PES; Deputy chairmen: Alexander Alvaro FDP/ALDE; Michael Cramer, The Greens/EFA; Joachim Zeller, CDU/EPP.

The groups organize events such as the parliamentary forum on the future of Europe, and political initiatives, such as placing the European flag on the Reichstag.

== Working Groups: Future of Europe, Europe-Professionel ==
In addition to the traditional grass-roots work in regional and local associations and the parliamentary work, EUD increasingly focuses on reaching new target groups as well as developing substantive concepts.

EUD has two working groups: One on the "future of Europe" and one called "Europe-Professionel". Europe-Professionel is a network of EUD members who deal with European topics in their professional lives. The group was founded in summer 2009. On behalf of EUD's executive board it promotes the Europeanization of German politics. Like EUD's Brussels section (see below), Europe-Professionel comprises lobbyists, civil servants and scientists. Just like parties, the group tries to promote their goals using personal contacts. Spokespersons of the group are the retired Secretary of State and insurance lobbyist Joachim Wuermeling and the civil servant Silke Kaul. Among the board members are the vice-executive of the North Rhine-Westphalian state representation Dirk Schattschneider and political scientist Ulrike Guérot. Next to organizing events for the target group, Europe-Professionel works on papers on the improvement of the European coordination of the German Federal Government.

== Executive Board ==
=== Members ===
President: Rainer Wieland MEP, Vice-president of the European Parliament

Vice-presidents: Eva Högl Member of the German Parliament | Ernst Johansson | Thomas Mann MEP

Treasurer: Joachim Wuermeling, retired state secretary

Secretary-General: Christian Moos

Chairman of the Federal Committee: Franz-Josef Klein

Further members of the executive board: Ralf Bingel | Reinhard Bütikofer MEP | Anton Freiherr von Cetto | Kristin Funke member of the regional parliament of Schleswig-Holstein | Lutz Hager | Ulla Kalbfleisch-Kottsieper | Sylvia-Yvonne Kaufmann | Enrico Kreft | Jürgen Lippold | Heinz-Wilhelm Schaumann (Vice-President of the UEF) | Otto Schmuck | Elisabeth Schnarrenberger-Oesterle | Gabriela Schneider | Thomas Stölting | Michael Theurer MdEP | Wolfgang Zapfe

Co-opted members: Werner Hoyer MdB, Dietrich von Kyaw, Gunther Krichbaum MdB, Jo Leinen MdEP, Manuel Sarrazin MdB, Daniela Schwarzer (Public Figures)

Honorary Presidents Peter Altmaier Member of the German Parliament | Elmar Brok MEP | Egon Klepsch retired President of the European Parliament | Walter Scheel, retired President of Germany

Honorary Members Arno Krause | Horst Seefeld, Ulrike Guérot| Hans-Joachim Seeler, retired Interior Minister of the Free and Hanseatic City of Hamburg

=== Spokespersons ===
In 2010, the executive board designated spokespersons for specific subject areas: Institutional questions – Otto Schmuck; Economic and financial policy – Joachim Wuermeling; Social Europe – Eva Högl; Energy and environmental policy – Heinz W. Schaumann; EU foreign and security policy – Reinhard Bütikofer; Interior and justice policy – Ulla Kalbfleisch-Kottsieper; EU enlargement – Ernst Johansson; Cultural and educational policy, gender, youth and sports – Enrico Kreft; European public and citizens' participation – Thomas Mann; European Parliament and European elections – Ralf Bingel; Media policy – Rainer Wieland; Regional, municipal and transport policy – Anton von Cetto; Consumerprotection – Eva Högl; Visions for Europe – Ulla Kalbfleisch-Kottsieper; EUD strategy and organizational development – Lutz Hager

== Regional Associations and Brussels ==
Europa-Union Deutschland has regional associations in 15 of the 16 States of Germany. The regional association of Saxony is under construction.

Europa-Union Deutschland also has a Brussels-based section for Germans working in Brussels temporarily. Michael Koehler, who was the Chief of Cabinet of EU Commissioner Joseph Borg, is chairman of the group. Since 2010, Kohler is Chef de Cabinet of the German EU Commissioner Günther Oettinger, who is also a member of EUD. The board consists of European Commission officials, members of the European Parliament, the Information Office of the German states, lobbyists and think tanks. The group organizes events and engages in networking. The group is not very strong in presenting a political position although pro-European networking in the sense of soft lobbying within the German community in Brussels is desired.

== ZDF broadcasting commission ==
EUD delegates a representative to the ZDF broadcasting commission, currently president Rainer Wieland. Within the ZDF broadcasting commission the representative of Europa-Union Deutschland is considered to be part of the "friends", the part of the broadcasting commission that has close connections to the CDU, despite the fact that EUD describes itself as nonpartisan.

== Criticism ==
In a 2010 report the German taxpayers' association criticizes the institutional funding of the organization by the German federal budget.

== Literature ==
- Wilfried Loth: Das Europa der Verbände: Die Europa-Union im europäischen Integrationsprozess (1949–1969). In: Jürgen Mittag, Wolfgang Wessels (Hrsg.): „Der Kölsche Europäer“ – Friedrich Carl von Oppenheim und die Europäische Einigung. Aschendorff, Münster 2005.
- Vanessa Conze: Für ein Europa im Westen: Friedrich Carl von Oppenheim und die Europa-Union Deutschland. In: Jürgen Mittag, Wolfgang Wessels (Hrsg.): „Der Kölsche Europäer“ – Friedrich Carl von Oppenheim und die Europäische Einigung. Aschendorff, Münster 2005.
- Aiga Seywald: 50 Jahre Einsatz für den Frieden, 50 Jahre Landesverband NRW der Europa Union Deutschland 1947–1997. Europa-Union, Bonn 1997, ISBN 3-7713-0547-0.
- Sergio Pistone, Otto Schmuck: Der Beitrag der Europäischen Föderalisten zum Einigungsprozess. In: Otto Schmuck (Hrsg.): Die Menschen für Europa gewinnen – Für ein Europa der Bürger. In memoriam Claus Schöndube. Bad-Marienberg, 2008, S. 93–114. (online, PDF-Datei; 107 kB)
