= Linn Selle =

German policymaker

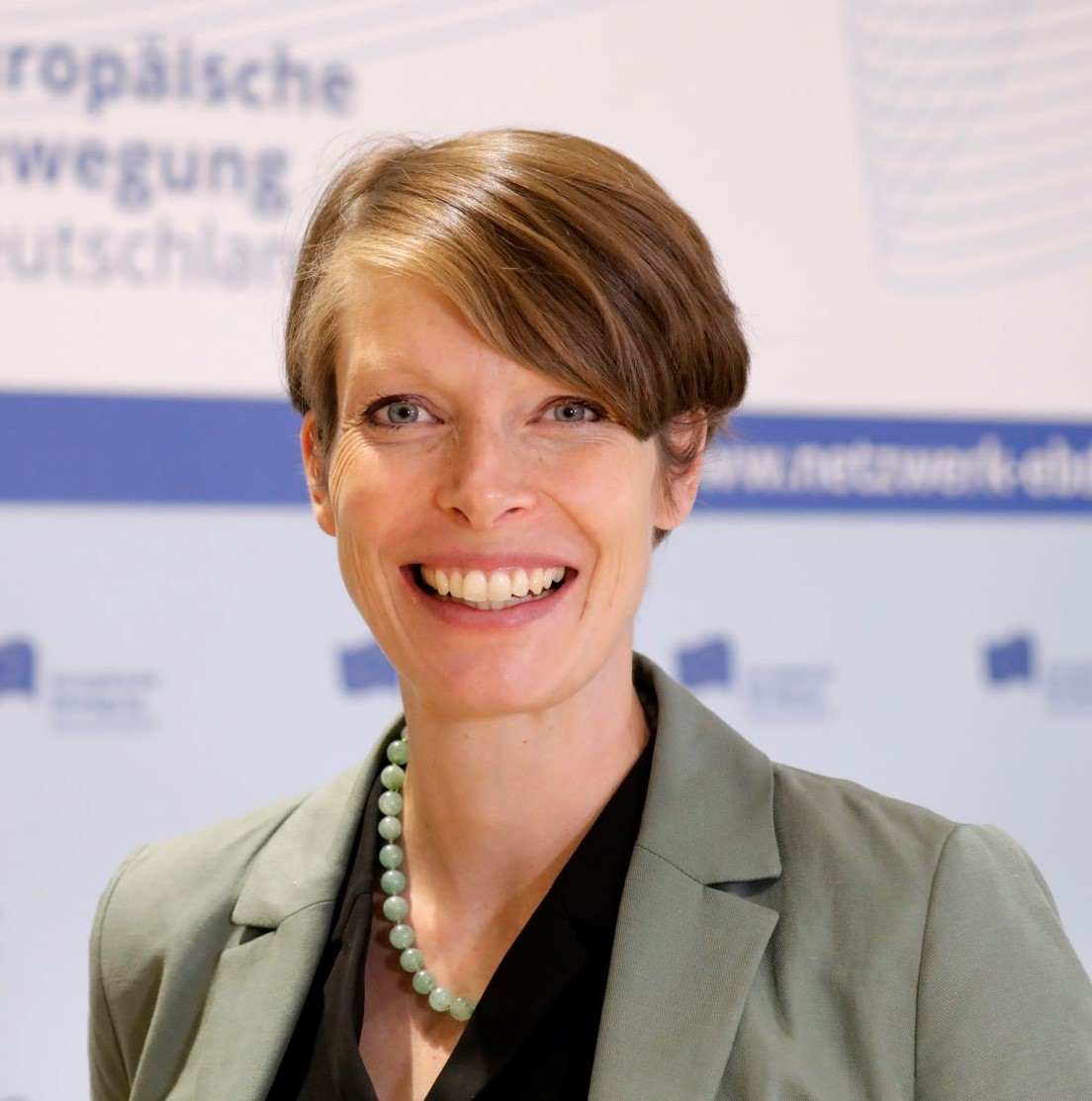
Linn Selle, 2021

Linn Selle (born 5 September 1986 in Havixbeck) is president of the European Movement Germany.

== Education ==
After graduating from the University of Bonn and Sciences Po with a bachelor's degree in political science, Selle completed a master's degree in European studies at the European University Viadrina. Here, she earned a doctor of philosophy degree under doctoral advisor Timm Beichelt on the role of the European Parliament and the German Bundestag in the negotiations on the EU's Multiannual Financial Framework 2014-2020.

== Career ==
Since June 2021, Selle has held the position of Head of the European Affairs Department at the Representation of the State of North Rhine-Westphalia to the Federal Government. Formerly, Selle worked for the Federation of German Consumer Organizations (VZBV) in Berlin-Kreuzberg as a consultant for international trade policy.

Selle has been president of the European Movement Germany since July 2, 2018. In this role, Selle regularly comments on current issues of European politics, for example, on German talk shows, such as Phoenix, hart aber fair, or Maybrit Illner. In an honorary capacity, Selle was initially involved in European politics through youth and association politics. She was active on the federal board of the Young European Federalists Germany (JEF Germany) from 2010. Between 2012 and 2014, Selle served as deputy federal chair of JEF Germany, and from June 2013 to November 2014, she acted as federal secretary. For her work with JEF Germany, Linn Selle was awarded the Women of Europe Award 2014. To date, she is the youngest recipient of the award. In the same year, Selle became an honorary member of the board of the European Movement Germany and served as a member of the presidium of the Europa Union Germany from May 2017 to March 2019. Selle caused a stir in April 2014 when she initiated an online petition to show the Europe-wide TV duel between all leading candidates for the office of the European Commission President in the main program of ARD and ZDF.
