= Marco Simoni =

Italian academic

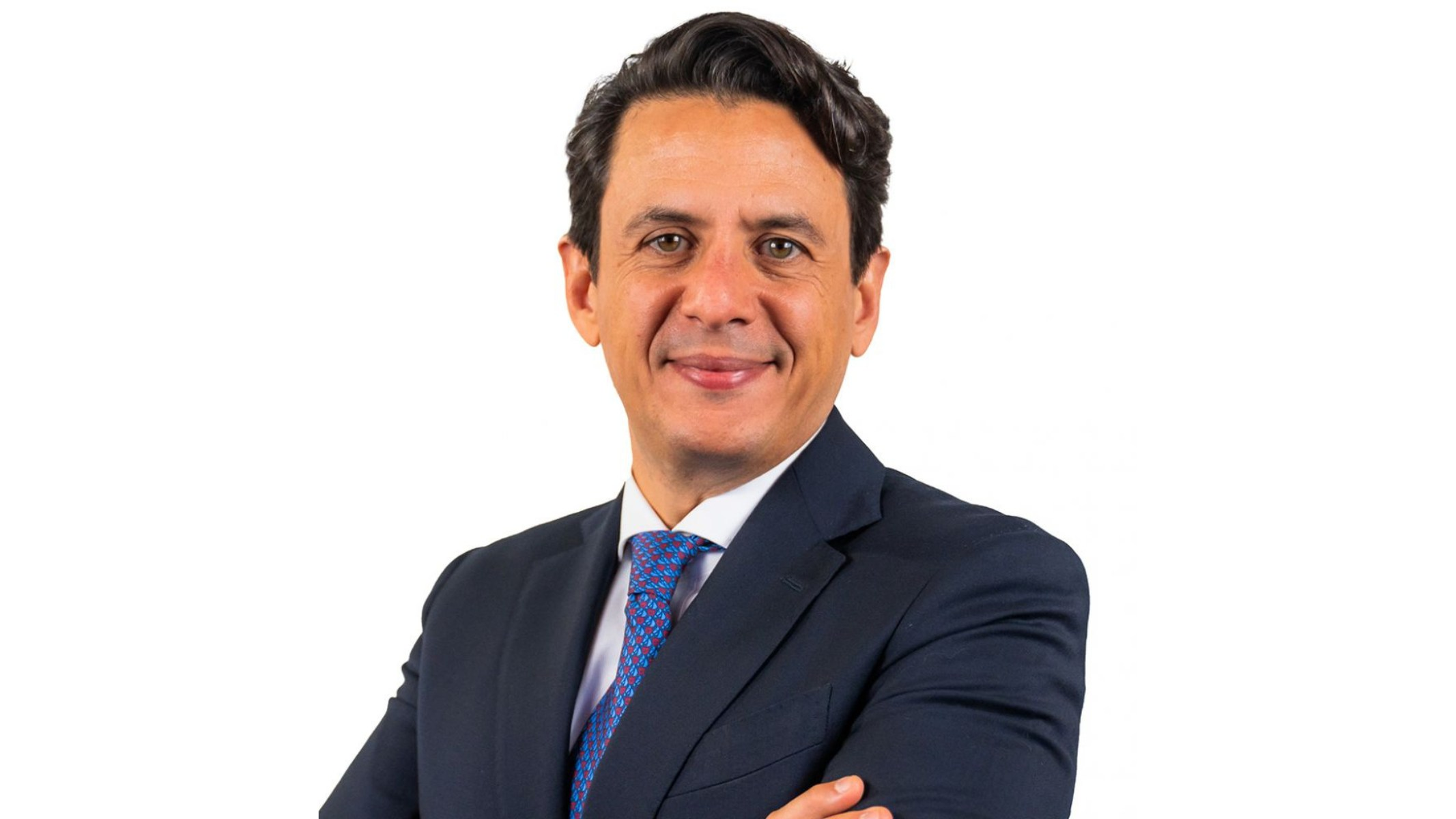

Director of the Istituto Affari Internazionali
- Incumbent
- Assumed office 1 May 2026

Marco Simoni (born 13 September 1974, Rome, Italy) is an Italian academic. He is currently the Director of the Istituto Affari Internazionali and Professor of Practice in European Political Economy at Luiss University in Rome

== Biography ==
He is married and has two children, both born in London.

He has a degree in Political Science from the Sapienza University of Rome and a PhD in Political Economy from London School of Economics and Political Science, which received the Juan J. Linz prize for best PhD thesis in Political Science in an EU member state. His thesis, dated 2007, was titled The renegotiated alliance between left and organised labour in western Europe.

He carried out research activity at the International Labour Organization in Geneva and in 2008 he received the Postdoctoral Fellowship from the British Academy for young researchers.

From 2007 to 2016, he taught and carried out research in comparative political economy at the London School of Economics, first as a post-doctoral fellow and later as an Assistant and then Associate Professor in Political Economy. He taught courses in European political economy, concepts in political and policy making in Europe.

=== Government positions ===
He moved to Italy from London in 2013 to take up the role of Chief Secretary for Deputy Minister for Economic Development Carlo Calenda, dealing with dossiers related to commercial policies, attraction of investment and policies for the internationalisation of Italy.

From 2014 to 2018, he was the International Economic Relations and Industrial Policy Councillor for Prime Ministers Matteo Renzi and Paolo Gentiloni. In this role he managed national and international relations, political and legal dossiers, coordinated ministries and public agencies, and contributed to the economic agenda of the Prime Minister.

Between 2016 and 2018 he was a member of the Arexpo Board of Directors and of the Coordination Committee for the Human Technopole Project, to follow the redevelopment of the ex-EXPO area in Milan.

=== Human Technopole ===
From May 2018 to July 2022 he has been the Founder President of the Human Technopole Foundation, the new Italian research institute for life sciences set in Palazzo Italia. This is within the former EXPO 2015 site, now rebranded as MIND – Milano Innovation District.

== Publications ==
He is the author of numerous academic publications on issues of comparative capitalism and he wrote “Senza alibi: perché il capitalismo italiano non cresce più”, a book on the decline of the Italian economy, which was published by Marsilio in 2012.

His op-eds appear regularly in Italian media. He has also collaborated with various other Italian dailies including Il Messaggero, Europa Quotidiano, l’Unità, il Sole24Ore, la Stampa, Il Foglio and others.
