= Günzach =

- Municipality
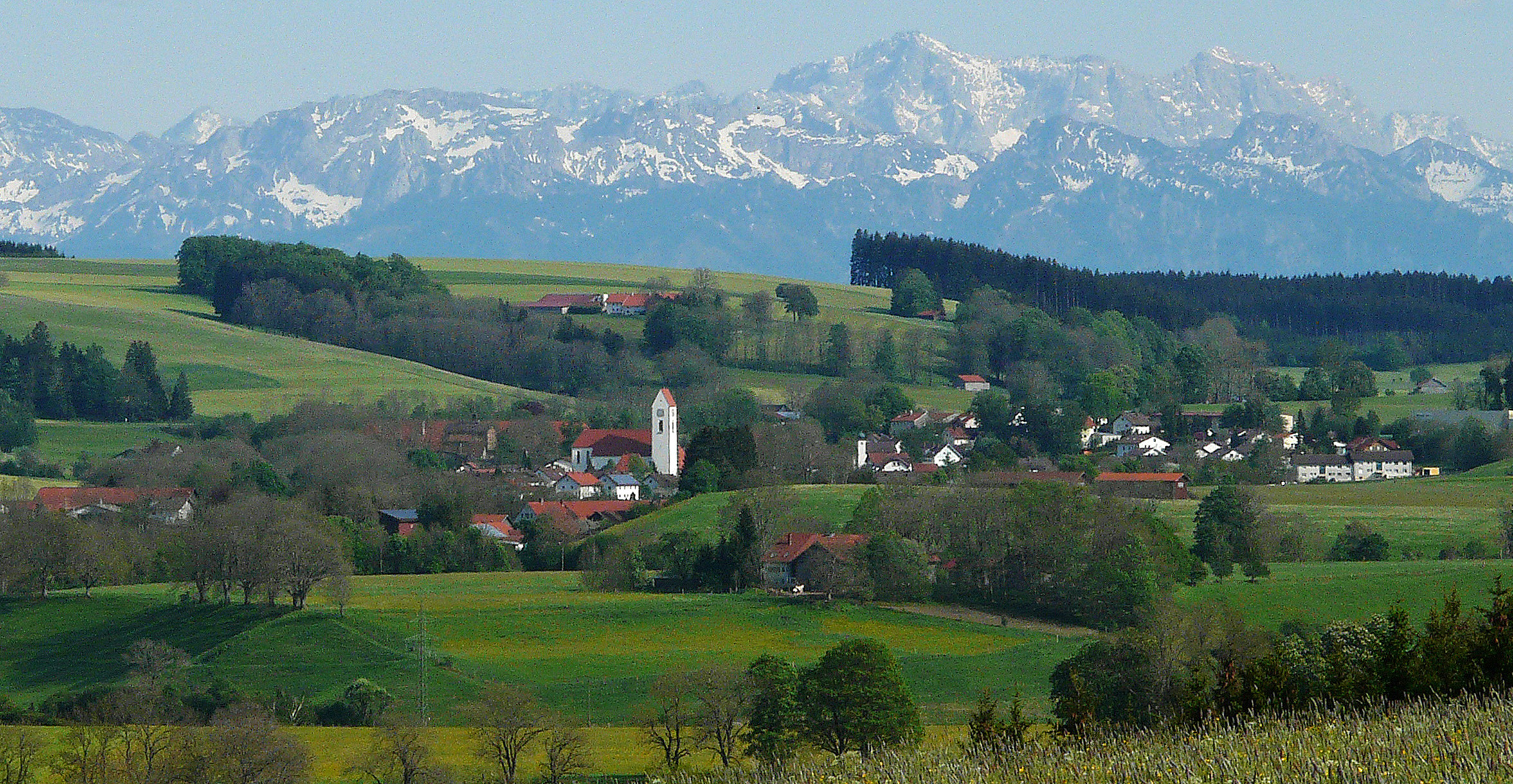
- Günzach seen from the northwest

- Coat of arms

- Location of Günzach within Ostallgäu district
- Interactive map of Günzach
- Location within Germany Location within Bavaria
- Coordinates: 47°49′N 10°27′E
- Country: Germany
- State: Bavaria
- Admin. region: Schwaben
- District: Ostallgäu
- Municipal assoc.: Obergünzburg

Government
  - Mayor (2020–26): Wilma Hofer

Area
  - Total: 23.48 km^{2} (9.07 sq mi)
- Elevation: 740–899 m (2,428–2,949 ft)

Population (2025-12-31)
  - Total: 1,352
  - Density: 57.58/km^{2} (149.1/sq mi)
- Time zone: UTC+01:00 (CET)
  - Summer (DST): UTC+02:00 (CEST)
- Postal codes: 87634
- Dialling codes: 08372
- Vehicle registration: OAL
- Website: www.guenzach.de

Günzach (German pronunciation: [ˈɡʏntsax]) is a municipality in the district of Ostallgäu in Bavaria in Germany.
