= Young European Movement UK =

UK section of JEF Europe and youth wing of EM UK

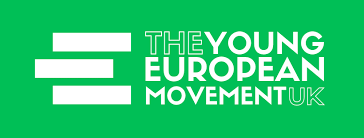
- President: Shirin Baghepour
- Vice President: Cameron Thompson
- Founded: 1972
- Headquarters: London, United Kingdom
- Ideology: Pro-Europeanism
- International affiliation: Young European Federalists
- Magazine: The New Federalist
- Website: www.yem.org.uk

The Young European Movement UK (YEM UK) is a non-partisan political group that advocates for increased youth participation in political affairs and for a close relationship between the United Kingdom and the European Union. It was formed in 1972 as a non-partisan platform for young people to express their opinions on Europe. It is the UK branch of the Young European Federalists and the youth wing of the European Movement UK.

== Activities ==
YEM UK has organised and been present at various marches and protests. In March 2017, an anti-Brexit protest was held in Edinburgh, at which the chairman of the local branch said: "We want to raise the issue in British and Scottish people's lives that you have lies in the referendum campaign that people were not held accountable for and, whether you voted Remain or Leave, that is a real issue".

YEM UK has campaigned on rejoining Erasmus+, running the 'Embrace Erasmus' petition, which had garnered over 41,000 signatures as of March 2024. On 19 May 2025, during the EU–UK Summit, YEM's President Alfred Quantrill called for "a Youth Experience Scheme that will open doors for British young people through education, training, and work".

YEM has also previously campaigned on ending Gender Based Violence in Europe.

== See also ==
- Brexit
- Young European Federalists
- Union of European Federalists
- European Movement UK
- Federalisation of the European Union
