= Barbara Lochbihler =

German politician (born 1959)

Barbara Lochbihler MEP
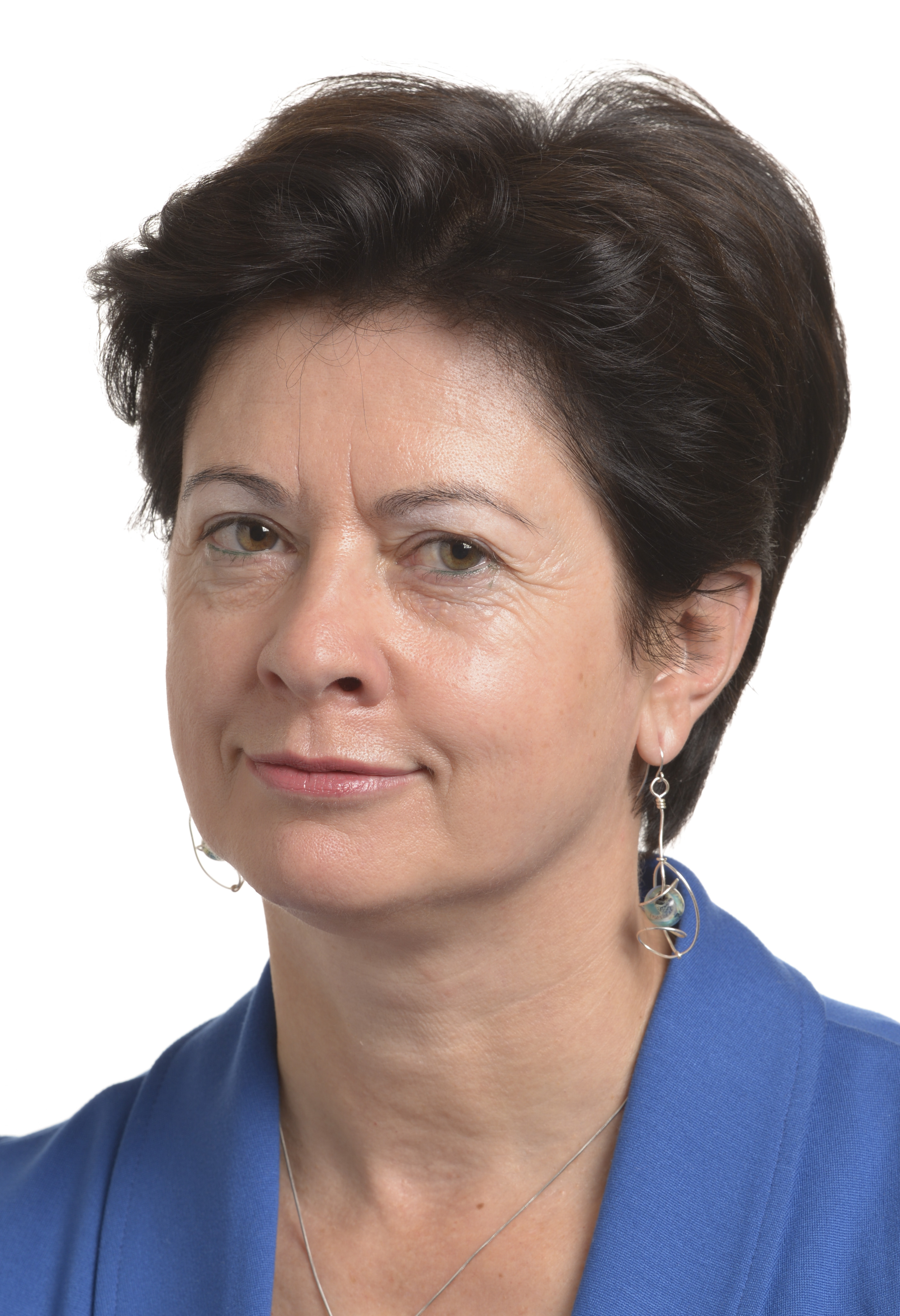

Member of the European Parliament
- In office 14 July 2009 – 2019
- Constituency: Germany

Personal details
- Born: 20 May 1959 (age 66) Obergünzburg, Free State of Bavaria, Germany
- Party: German: Alliance 90/The Greens; European Union: The Greens–European Free Alliance

Barbara Elisabeth Lochbihler (born 20 May 1959, Obergünzburg) is a German politician who served as Member of the European Parliament (MEP) from 2009 until 2019. She is a member of the Alliance 90/The Greens, part of the European Green Party.

== Early career ==
Between 1992 and 1999 Lochbihler was the Secretary General of the Women’s International League for Peace and Freedom. For a decade from 1999 she served as Secretary General at Amnesty International Germany.

== Political career ==
After becoming a Member of the European Parliament, Lochbihler served on the Subcommittee on Human Rights (DROI), including as chairwoman from 2011 until 2014. She was also a member of the Committee on Foreign Affairs (AFET) and the parliament's delegation for relations with the countries of Southeast Asia and the Association of Southeast Asian Nations (ASEAN).

Within her Greens–European Free Alliance parliamentary group, Lochbihler served as the human rights and foreign policy spokesperson.

Already in 2016, Lochbihler announced that she would not stand in the 2019 European elections but instead resign from active politics by the end of the parliamentary term.

== Other activities ==
- Petra Kelly Foundation, Member of the Board of Trustees
