= European Competition =

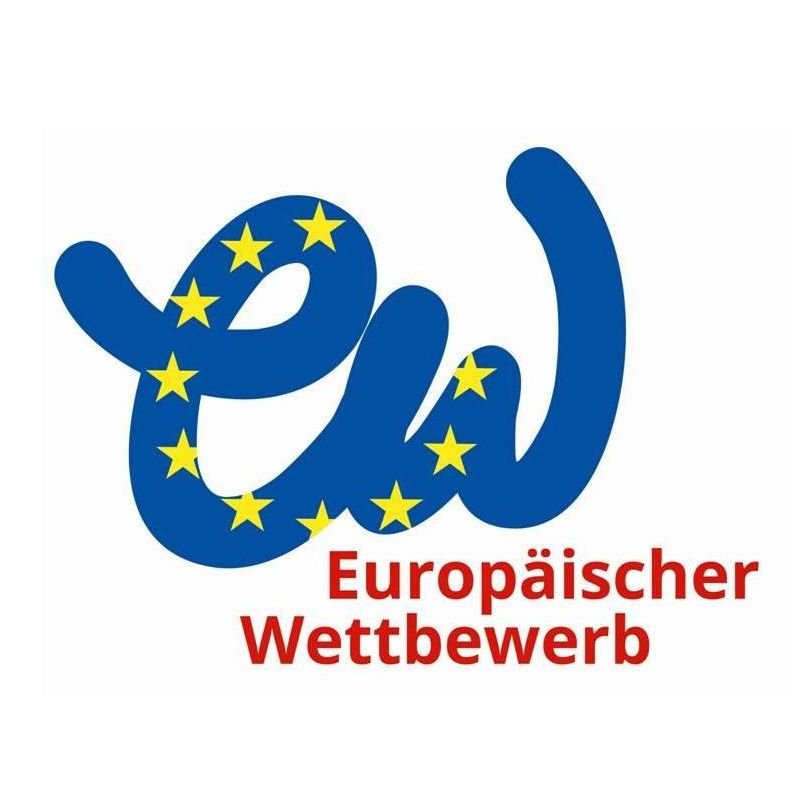
The official logo of the European competition

The European Competition is a student competition in which students of all ages submit creative, artistic, or written pieces of work on the activities of the European Union. Tendered by European Movement Germany, it is the oldest student competition in Germany. It was first launched as an essay competition in North Rhine-Westphalia in 1953. Only one year later, all other German federal states joined the initiative. The contest is one of the earliest transnational projects on civic education. Today, it is implemented in about fifteen countries.

Each year, an average of 75,000 students take part in the contest. The topics are determined by four modules which are broken down by age and oriented towards the theme of the European Year, launched annually by the European Union. The requirements demand that all submitted pieces of work account for a European perspective. Societal, economic, political, and cultural aspects are central to the competition. However, the way in which the topics are dealt with is up to the contestants.

The Kultusministerkonferenz, a voluntary consortium of the German federal education ministers, appoints a governing committee that establishes the guidelines of the competition.

== Aims ==
Being a proven instrument of practical education, the European Competition enables German schools to fulfil their European educational mandate as set out by the Kultusministerkonferenz. As a themed competition that is addressed towards all age groups and types of school the European Competition stimulates an in-depth engagement with European topics and questions. The contest directs the students’ – but also the teachers’ – perception towards the European dimension of diverse subject-matters and teaching contents.

Task and methodology offer teachers the possibility to explore the European dimension of various subject-matters during class sessions. The themes as set out in the modules indicate where European dynamics become effective and where European decisions are required. They furthermore illustrate that in many cases only collective action can lead to a success. Through the students’ independent and creative engagement with common values, aims, challenges, and possibilities of European integration, the contest aims at contributing to the creation of a European awareness. Another goal is to enable young people to actively perform their future role as citizens of the European Union.

== Course ==
From the beginning of the school year in August or September until the following February, entries to the competition can be prepared and submitted. Subsequently, they are presented to a jury in the respective federal state, which may award prices and recommends the best works to a national jury. This committee usually convenes in March and publishes the list of laureates in April. The prizes are awarded in the federal states, often arranged around the Europe Days in May.

== Reorientation ==
In 2009, the European Competition was remodelled in terms of content and structure. Key points of the new concept:

- The activities of the European Union are emphasised more explicitly.
- Students turning in purely artistic works have to illustrate the European dimension in written form.
- The separation into artistic and written themes has been abolished. The assignments can now be approached in manifold ways.
- In addition to contributions from the subjects German and art, works based on history, politics, geography, religious education, or ethics are appreciated.
- Cooperations with European partners or partner schools are encouraged.

== Funding ==
The European Competition is funded by the German Federal Ministry of Education and Research and the German Foreign Office. It is also supported by the Kultusministerkonferenz, the Ministries of Culture and Education as well as the Senate Administrations of the German federal states, and the Federal Press Office.

== Cooperation with eTwinning ==
In order to support transnational collaboration between pupils, a new online branch of the European Competition was established in 2012 by cooperating with eTwinning. School classes from different European countries can work collaboratively on the tasks of the Competition. The project kits are adapted to the different age groups and to the specific work conditions in the TwinSpace.
