= Obergünzburg (Verwaltungsgemeinschaft) =

- Verwaltungsgemeinschaft
- Location of Obergünzburg within Ostallgäu district
- Interactive map of Obergünzburg
- Location within Germany Location within Bavaria
- Coordinates: 47°51′N 10°25′E
- Country: Germany
- State: Bavaria
- Admin. region: Swabia
- District: Ostallgäu
- Seat: Obergünzburg
- Subdivisions: 3 municipalities

Area
  - Total: 95.91 km^{2} (37.03 sq mi)

Population (2025-12-31)
  - Total: 9,392
  - Density: 97.93/km^{2} (253.6/sq mi)
- Time zone: UTC+01:00 (CET)
  - Summer (DST): UTC+02:00 (CEST)
- Website: www.vg-oberguenzburg.de

Obergünzburg is a Verwaltungsgemeinschaft (municipal association) in the district Ostallgäu in Bavaria, Germany. Its seat is in Obergünzburg.

It consists of the following municipalities:

1. Günzach
2. Obergünzburg
3. Untrasried
