= Joachim Wuermeling =

German politician (born 1960)

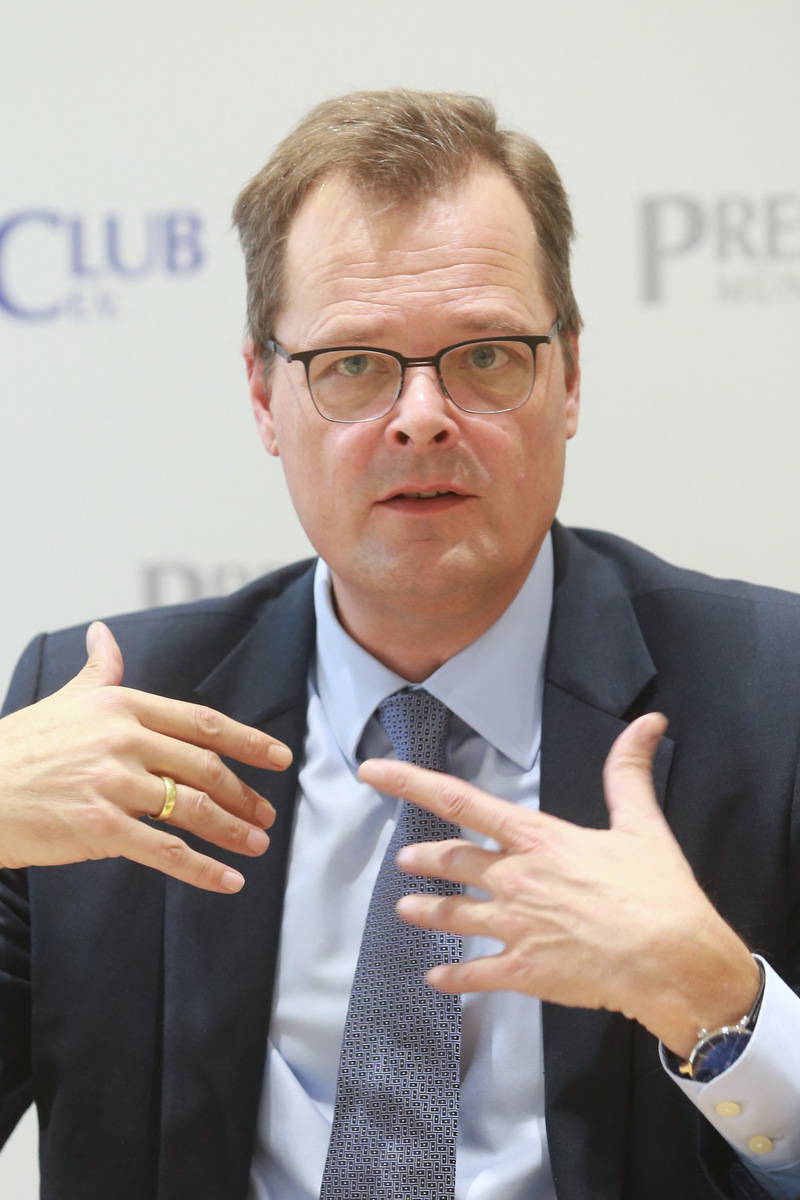
Joachim Wuermeling in 2017

Joachim Wuermeling (born 19 July 1960 in Münster) a German politician of the Christian Social Union in Bavaria. Between 2005 and 2008, he served as State Secretary for the European Union in the German Federal Ministry for Economics and Technology.

== Education ==
- 1985: First state law examination
- 1987: Doctor of Law
- 1989: Second state law examination
- 1990: Master of comparative, European and international law at the European University Institute in Florence

== Early career ==
- since 1996: Lecturer of the University of Potsdam
- since 2000: Lawyer
- 1989-1993: European affairs officer, Bavaria Office, Bonn
- 1993-1999: Section head, European affairs division, Bavarian State Chancellery, Munich
- 1993-1995: Staff Member of the Commissioner Schmidhuber's private office, Brussels

== Political career ==
- since 1996: Member of the Upper Franconia CSU District Executive
- since 1997: Member of the CSU European affairs committee
- since 1998: Member of the CSU Party Committee
- since 1999: Member of the CSU Policy and Drafting Commissions
- since 2000: District Chairman of the Upper Franconia CSU Lawyers

=== Member of the European Parliament, 1999–2005 ===
From 1999 to 2005, Wuermeling was a Member of the European Parliament for Bavaria with the Christian Social Union in Bavaria, part of the European People's Party and served on the European Parliament's Committee on the Internal Market and Consumer Protection.

During his time in the Parliament, Wuermeling was a substitute for the Committee on Constitutional Affairs, a member of the Delegation to the EU-Bulgaria Joint Parliamentary Committee and a substitute for the Delegation for relations with the Gulf States, including Yemen. Most notably, he was the Parliament’s rapporteur on the Consumer Credit Directive.

Other roles included:

- 1999-2005: Member of the European Parliament
- 1999-2001: Vice-Chairman of the Delegation to Estonia
- 2002-2003: Substitute Member of the European Parliament Delegation to the European Convention
- 2002-2004: EPP Deputy coordinator, Committee on Constitutional Affairs

=== State Secretary, 2005–2008 ===
Following the 2005 German elections, Wuermeling was appointed State Secretary at the Federal Ministry for Economics and Technology. under minister Michael Glos in the first cabinet of Chancellor Angela Merkel. In this capacity, he was primarily in charge of energy issues. He also served as the government’s coordinator for EU policies and held a key role during Germany’s presidency of the Council of the European Union in 2007.

In early 2008, Glos put Wuermeling in temporary retirement from government employment and replaced him with Jochen Homann.

== Life after politics ==
Between 2005 and 2011, Wuermeling served as member of the Executive Board of the German Insurance Association (GDV), where he was in charge of European and international affairs. In this capacity, he was also a member of the European Economic and Social Committee.

From 2011 to 2016, Wuermeling served as chairman of the Association of Sparda Banks, a group of twelve regional cooperative banks in Germany.

In July 2016, following a proposal of Bavaria, the Bundesrat nominated Wuermeling as member of the Executive Board of the Deutsche Bundesbank. He left this position in 2023.

Since 2024, Wuermeling has been employed as senior advisor at the Frankfurt office of law firm Allen & Overy.

== Other activities ==
- House of Finance, Goethe University Frankfurt, Member of the Board of Trustees
- Leibniz Institute for Financial Research (SAFE), Member of the Policy Council
- Research Institute for Application-Oriented Knowledge Processing (FAW), Member of the Board of Trustees
- Institute for European Politics (IEP), Member of the Board of Trustees
- Rotary International, Member
