= Trans European Policy Studies Association =

European think tank network

- Abbreviation: TEPSA
- Formation: 1974
- Type: Research organisation
- Headquarters: Brussels
- Website: www.tepsa.eu

The Trans European Policy Studies Association (TEPSA) is a European network of research institutes and think tanks in the field of European affairs. Founded in 1974, it is an international nonprofit association under Belgian law with 44 member organisations in 37 different European countries, and an office in Brussels.

== History ==
TEPSA was founded in 1974 by four research institutes: the Institut für Europaische Politik (Germany), the Istituto Affari Internazionali (Italy), the Federal Trust for Education and Research (UK) and the Association Française pour l’Etude de l’Union Européenne (France). In 1978, upon the accession of its Belgian member, Prof. Jacques Vandamme, former adviser to Belgian Prime minister Leo Tindemans, was designated president of the association. TEPSA progressively extended its membership to 20 institutes in the year 2000. In 2016, full membership was opened to organizations from all European countries outside the European Union, allowing TEPSA to expand to 38 members in 2017. The current Chairman of the TEPSA board is Prof. Michael Kaeding (University of Duisburg-Essen), succeeding to Prof. Wolfgang Wessels (University of Cologne).

In 2016, TEPSA was ranked as 12th best think-tank network by the University of Pennsylvania’s Global Go To Think Tank Index Report, an annual ranking of the world’s best think-tanks.

== Aims and activities ==
TEPSA aims at maintaining a stable framework for transnational research cooperation in the field of European affairs, and providing new opportunities for academics and students in the field, mainly through EU-funded research and education projects. With one member in each EU country and members in EFTA, Eastern Neighborhood and candidate countries, but also a number of associate members, TEPSA seeks to stimulate discussion on policy options for Europe by bringing together academics and students from across the continent, and connecting them with practitioners and policymakers.

Since its founding in 1974, TEPSA organises a conference twice a year with academics and policymakers on the agenda of the upcoming presidency of the Council of the European Union (the Pre-Presidency Conference), where it delivers a set of recommendations to representatives of the presiding member state. The conference is jointly organised with and hosted by the member organisation in the concerned country.

TEPSA also regularly delivers its members' expertise to the European Parliament in briefings and studies.

== TEPSA members ==
=== Full members ===
Country	Member
Austria	Institute for Advanced Studies (IHS)
Bulgaria	New Bulgarian University (NBU)
Croatia	Institute for Development and International Relations (IRMO)
Cyprus	University of Nicosia, Department of European Studies and International Relations
Czech Republic	Institute of International Relations (IIR)
Denmark	Danish Institute of International Studies (DIIS)
Estonia	Estonian Foreign Policy Institute (EVI)
Finland	Finnish Institute of International Affairs (FIIA)
France	Centre of European Studies, Sciences Po – CNRS
Germany	Institute for European Politics (IEP)
Greece	Greek Centre of European Studies and Research (EKEME)
Hungary	Institute of World Economics, Centre for Economic and Regional Studies of the Hungarian Academy of Sciences
Iceland	Institute of International Affairs and Centre for Small State Studies, University of Iceland
Ireland	Institute of International and European Affairs (IIEA)
Italy	International Affairs Institute (IAI)
Latvia	Latvian Institute of International Affairs (LIIA)
Liechtenstein	Liechtenstein Institute
Lithuania	Institute of International Relations and Political Science (IIRPS)
Luxembourg	Robert Schuman Centre of European Research and Studies, University of Luxembourg
North Macedonia	Faculty of Law Iustinianus Primus, Ss. Cyril and Methodus University in Skopje
Malta	Institute for European Studies, University of Malta
Netherlands	Netherlands Institute of International Relations Clingendael
Norway	Norwegian Institute of International Affairs (NUPI)
Poland	European Institute Łódź
Portugal	Portuguese Institute of International Relations, New University of Lisbon (IPRI-NUL)
Romania	Romanian Centre for European Policies (CRPE)
Slovakia	Institute of European Studies and International Relations (IESIR), Comenius University
Slovenia	Centre of International Relations, University of Ljubljana
Spain	Elcano Royal Institute of International and Strategic Studies
Sweden	Swedish Institute for International Affairs (UI)
Switzerland	Center for Comparative and International Studies (CIS), ETH Zurich and University of Zurich
Turkey	Center for European Studies (CES), Middle East Technical University (METU)
Ukraine	Razumkov Centre
United Kingdom	The Federal Trust for Education and Research

=== Associate members ===
Country	Member
Belgium	College of Europe, Bruges Campus
Poland	College of Europe, Natolin Campus
France	Centre International de Formation Européenne (CIFE)
Montenegro	Faculty of Economics Podgorica, University of Montenegro
The Netherlands	European Institute of Public Administration (EIPA)

== Governance ==
=== Board members ===
Name	Position
Prof. Michael Kaeding, Chairman of the Board	Professor and Jean-Monnet Chair in the Department of Political Science of the University of Duisburg-Essen.
Prof. Jaap de Zwaan, Secretary General	Emeritus Professor of European Union Law, Erasmus University, Rotterdam, and former Lector in European Integration, The Hague University for Applied Sciences.
Mr. Pierre Florent Peterkenne, Treasurer	Former auditor at Ernst & Young Company Auditors.
Dr. Katrin Böttger, Board Member	Deputy Director of the Institut für Europäische Politik (IEP), Berlin.
Prof. Michele Chang, Board Member	Professor in the Department of European Political and Governance Studies of the College of Europe, Bruges.
Prof. Atila Eralp, Board Member	Director of the Center for European Studies and Professor in the Department of International Relations of the Middle East Technical University (METU), Ankara.
Dr. Juha Jokela, Board Member	Director of the European Union Research Programme at the Finnish Institute of International Affairs (FIIA), Helsinki.
Prof. Petr Kratochvíl, Board Member	Director of the Institute of International Relations (IIR), Prague, and Chairman of the Academic Council of the Diplomatic Academy of the Ministry of Foreign Affairs of the Czech Republic.
Dr. Sabina Lange, Board Member	Lecturer at the European Institute of Public Administration (EIPA), Maastricht, and Senior Associate Analyst at the EU Institute for Security Studies (EUISS), Paris.
Prof. Lucia Mokrá, Board Member	Dean of the Faculty of Social and Economic Sciences of Comenius University, Bratislava.
Prof. Frank Schimmelfennig, Board Member	Professor at ETH Zurich and Director of the Center of Comparative and International Studies of ETH Zurich and the University of Zurich.
Dr. Funda Tekin, Board Member	Senior Researcher at the Centre international de formation européenne (CIFE), Berlin, and Senior Research Adviser at the Institut für Europäische Politik (IEP), Berlin, vice-director of the University of Cologne.

=== Honorary board members ===
Name	Position
Graham Avery	Honorary Director-General of the European Commission, Senior Adviser at the European Policy Centre (EPC).
Andrew Duff	Former Member of the European Parliament, 1999–2014. Former President of the Union of European Federalists. Visiting fellow at the European Policy Centre (EPC)
Christian Frank	Honorary Professor, Université Catholique de Louvain.
Jean Paul Jacquė	Honorary Director General and Special Councillor at the council, Professor at the University of Strasbourg and at the College of Europe.
Jean-Victor Louis	Honorary Professor, Université Libre de Bruxelles.
Jacques Vandamme	Honorary President of the Study Group for European Policies (SEP-GEPE).
Guy Vanhaeverbeke	Honorary Director of the European Parliament Information Service.
Wolfgang Wessels	Jean Monnet Chair ad personam, University of Cologne, former Chairman of the TEPSA Board.
