= Wolfgang Wessels =

German political scientist

Wolfgang Theodor Wessels (* January 19, 1948 in Cologne) is a German political scientist. He holds the Jean Monnet Chair ad personam in political science, is a retired professor at the University of Cologne, and the head of the Centre for Turkey and European Studies (CETEUS) at the University of Cologne.

== Life ==
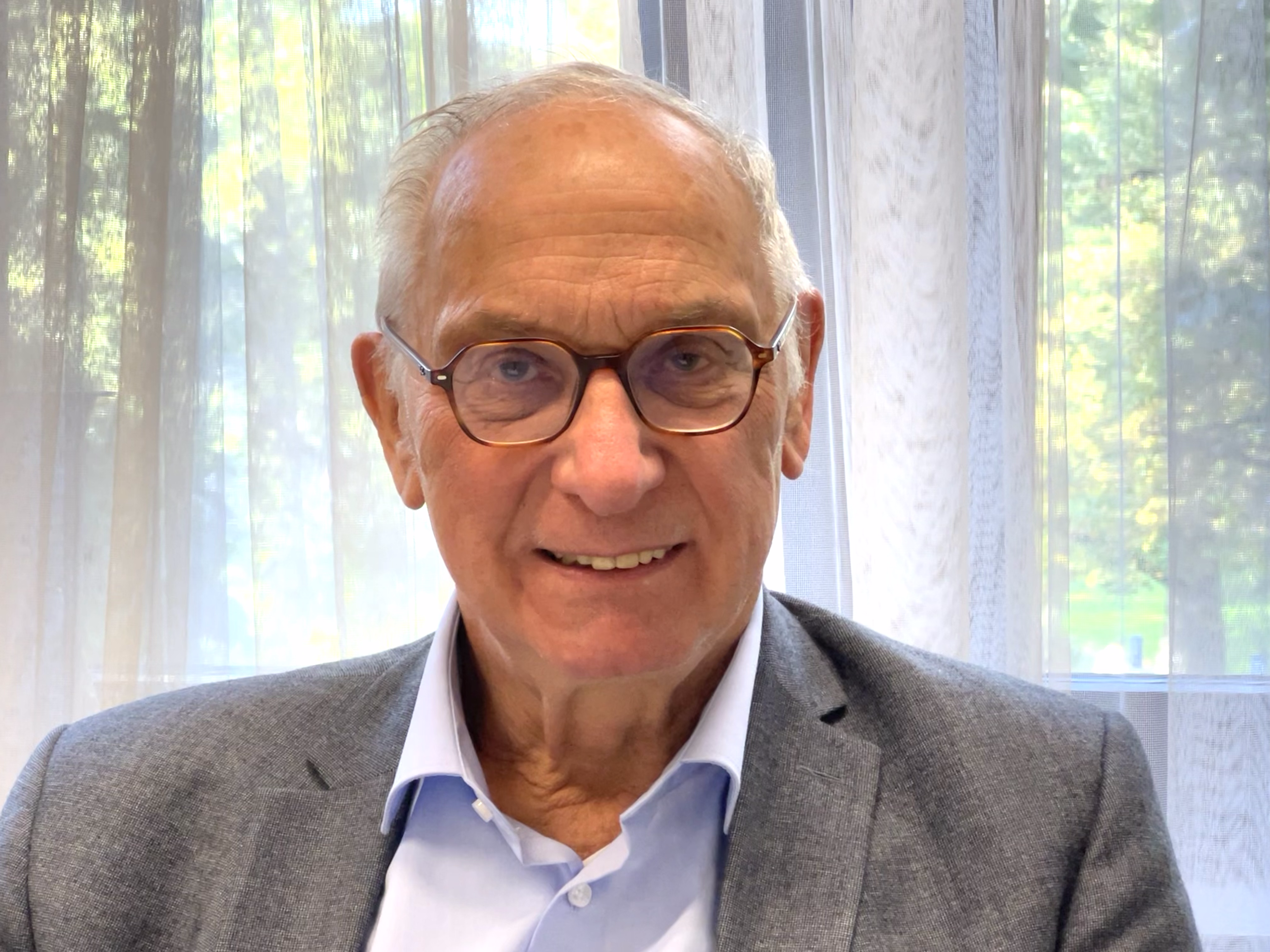
Wolfgang Wessels in 2022

Wolfgang Wessels graduated with a master's degree in economics and political science in 1973 and subsequently worked as director of the Institute for European Politics from 1973 to 1993. He completed his doctorate in political science in 1979 at the WISO Faculty of the University of Cologne with a thesis on the European Council. Between 1981 and 1994, Wessels also headed the Department of Political Science at the College of Europe. In 1990, Wessels was awarded the venia legendi in political science by the University of Bonn with a thesis on the opening of the state.

Since 1994 he has held the chair and since 2011 the ad personam of the Jean Monnet Chair at the University of Cologne. Although Wessels retired in 2016, he continues to conduct research on the European Union with a mandate from the rector at the University of Cologne and represents the University of Cologne as vice president of the German Consortium for the Turkish-German University since 2010.

He served as a visiting professor at the European University Institute in Florence and taught at the Institut d'études politiques de Paris (Sciences Po Paris) as holder of the Alfred Grosser Chair.

He regularly teaches as a visiting professor at the College of Europe in Bruges and Natolin, as well as at the European Online Academy of the Centre international de Formation Européen (Nice and Berlin) and at the Diplomatic Academy in Vienna.

Wessels was chairman of the board of the Institute for European Politics in Berlin between 1995 and 2018 and chairman of the board of the Trans European Policy Studies Association (TEPSA) in Brussels between 1995 and 2016. He is honorary chairman of both think tanks.

Since his student days, Wessels has been involved in civil society associations for the unification of Europe - first with the Jungen Europäischen Föderalisten and later with the Europa Union Deutschland. He is currently chairman of the Cologne district association of the Europa Union Germany and regularly organizes non-university educational events on topics related to the European Union.

Wolfgang Wessels married Aysin Wessels in 1975 and has two children with her.

== Research and Projects ==
Wessels' main research interests relate to the political system of the European Union and specifically to its institutional architecture with the European Council and the national parliaments as key institutions. He also focuses on the European Union's external relations - especially its relationship with Turkey. Other areas of focus are the deepening and widening of European integration and approaches to integration theory.

Wessels is co-editor of the Jahrbuch der Europäischen Integration (1. - 41st edition) and of Europa von A-Z. Taschenbuch der europäischen Integration (14th edition). In addition, Wessels has published in several leading German and English journals.

In those years he initiated and coordinated a number of research projects on the development of European integration, funded among others, by the German Research Foundation and the European Commission, as well as the Thyssen and Merkator Foundations.

== Achievements and awards ==
In 2007, the European Commission recognized his work as head of the Jean Monnet Chair with the "Jean Monnet - European Studies" Gold Award ("Jean Monnet - European Studies GOLD"). In 2011, Wessels was awarded the Lifetime Achievement in Contemporary Studies by the University Association for Contemporary European Studies (UACES) for his work. In 2014, he received the University Award for Teaching and the "University Award for Research" by the University of Cologne. In 2016, the "Vision for Europe" award of the Prague European Summit was dedicated to him.

== Selected works ==
- as editor with Werner Weidenfeld: Jahrbuch der Europäischen Integration 1980–2021, Nomos, Bonn/Baden-Baden 1981–2021. ISSN 0721-5436.
- as editor with Werner Weidenfeld: Europa von A–Z. Taschenbuch der europäischen Integration. Nomos, Bonn / Berlin / Baden-Baden 1991–2016, ISBN 978-3-8487-0519-1 (14. Auflage, 2016).
- with Tobias Kunstein and Lucas Schramm:The European Council as a Crisis Manager. The EU's fiscal response to the COVID-19 pandemic. Nomos, Bonn / Berlin / Baden-Baden 2022, ISBN 978-3-8487-8437-0
- Das politische System der Europäischen Union. Springer VS, Wiesbaden 2020 (2. Auflage).
- The European Council as a Transformative Force. In: H. Wallace, N. Koutsiaras, G. Pagoulatos (Hrsg.): Europe's Transformations: Essays in Honour of Loukas Tsoukalis. Oxford: Oxford University Press 2021, pp. 117–131.
- Keynote article: the constitutional treaty–three readings from a fusion perspective. In: JCMS: Journal of Common Market Studies, 43 (2005): 11–36.
- An ever closer fusion? A dynamic macropolitical view on integration processes. In: JCMS: Journal of Common Market Studies 35.2 (1997): 267–299.
- The European Council, Palgrave Macmillan, Basingstoke, 2016.
- Der Europäische Rat: Stabilisierung statt Integration? Geschichte, Entwicklung und Zukunft der EG-Gipfelkonferenzen (= Europäische Studien des Instituts für Europäische Politik, Band 13), Europa-Union-Verlag, Bonn 1980, ISBN 3-7713-0142-4 (Dissertation Uni Köln 1979, 472 Seiten).
