= Istituto Affari Internazionali =

International affairs think tank in Rome, Italy

- Formation: 1965
- Type: International relations think tank
- Headquarters: Via dei Montecatini, 17
- Location: Rome, Italy
- President: Michele Valensise
- Vice Presidents: Sonia Lucarelli, Michele Nones (Executive), Pier Carlo Padoan
- Director: Marco Simoni
- Website: iai.it/en

The Istituto Affari Internazionali (IAI) (Institute of International Affairs) is an Italian international relations think tank, and non-profit organisation founded in 1965 by Altiero Spinelli. It is ranked among the global top-20 think tanks in the "Foreign Policy and International Relations" and "Defense and National Security" categories, according to the 2020 Global Go To Think Tank Index.

== History ==
Altiero Spinelli was the institute's first director, thanks to joint contributions from the Fondazione Olivetti, the cultural and political association Il Mulino and the Nord e Sud Research Center, as well as to substantial support from the Ford Foundation. Spinelli took North American and British think tanks as a model: he created a flexible private organization, distinct from university institutes and governmental or ministerial research centers, yet capable of inter-acting and cooperating with the government, the public administration, national economic actors and foreign academic centers. These are still the IAI's outstanding features today. In September 2020 the Institute moved to Palazzo Cipolla, an elegant Neo-Renaissance building in the heart of Rome. The institute's main objective is to promote an understanding of the problems of international politics through studies, research, training, meetings and publications, with the aim of increasing the opportunities of all countries to move in the direction of supranational organization, democratic freedom and social justice (IAI Bylaws, Article 1).

== Research ==
Research focuses on the following thematic areas:

- Defence, Security and Space
- Energy and climate
- Europe
- Geoeconomics and global governance (international political economy, WTO, G7)
- Global competition and political risk (United States, Latin America, Asia, Russia)
- Mediterranean, Middle East and Africa

The research staff is made up of nearly 40 researchers, including area or project directors. Most of the research projects are carried out together with other institutes with similar characteristics.

The institute is an active participant in – and has sometimes even been a promoter of – important transnational research networks:

- Council of Councils
- ETTG (European Think Tanks Group)
- TEPSA (Trans European Policy Studies Association)

== Publications ==
- The International Spectator, a peer-reviewed English-language international relations quarterly, published by Routledge (Taylor & Francis Group)
- Trends and Perspectives in International Politics, a series of books on topical questions in international relations, published by Routledge
- IAI Research Studies, a series of books on problems of international affairs in either English or Italian
- IAI Papers and Documenti IAI, two series of papers produced within the context of IAI research projects and areas of expertise
- IAI Commentaries, op-eds on a variety of contemporary issues in Italian and global affairs
- AffarInternazionali, an Italian language webzine on politics, strategy and economics

In addition, the IAI manages two websites:

- iai.it/en: the IAI's official website
- Affarinternazionali.it: the site of the webzine by the same name

== Bibliography ==
- Angelini, Stefania (1990). La fondazione, le attività e gli scopi dell'Istituto affari internazionali fino agli inizi degli anni 70. Tesi di laurea (in Italian). Rome: Facoltà di Lettere e filosofia dell'Università La Sapienza.
- Darnis, Jean-Pierre; Marrone, Alessandro (2017). "The Istituto Affari Internazionali as non-state actor for Italy's foreign policy?" (PDF). Cahiers de la Méditerranée (94): 331–349. doi:10.4000/cdlm.8750. S2CID 158069641.
- Diletti, Mattia (2009). I think tank (in Italian). Bologna: Il Mulino. pp. 112–113. ISBN 978-88-15-13058-7.
- Graglia, Piero S. (2010). "Altiero Spinelli e la genesi dello IAI: il federalismo, il gruppo de 'il Mulino' e la dimensione internazionale del lavoro culturale". In Preda, Daniela (ed.). Altiero Spinelli e i movimenti per l'unità europea (in Italian). Padova: Cedam. pp. 245–278. ISBN 978-88-13-29110-5.
- Graglia, Piero S. (2008). "Nuovi spazi: l'avventura dello Iai". Altiero Spinelli (in Italian). Bologna: Il Mulino. pp. 445–470. ISBN 978-88-15-12162-2.
- McGann, James G. (2021). "2020 Global Go To Think Tank Index Report" (PDF). TTCSP Global Go to Think Tank Index Reports. Archived from the original on January 28, 2021.
- Merlini, Cesare (1986). "Altiero Spinelli and the founding of the IAI". The International Spectator. 21 (3): 3–5. doi:10.1080/03932728608456590.
- Merlini, Cesare, ed. (2016). La politica estera dell'Italia. Cinquant'anni dell'Istituto Affari Internazionali (in Italian). Bologna: Il Mulino. ISBN 978-88-15-26599-9.
- Pasquinucci, Daniele (2000). "Un seminario di intellettuali politici: l'Istituto affari internazionali". Europeismo e democrazia. Altiero Spinelli e la sinistra europea (in Italian). Bologna: Il Mulino. pp. 231–240. ISBN 978-88-15-07745-5.
- Pasquinucci, Daniele (1996). "Altiero Spinelli consigliere del principe: la lotta per la federazione europea negli anni sessanta" (PDF). Digips Working Papers (in Italian) (23): 11–16.
- Spinelli, Altiero (1976). "AS.C.A-04: Istituto Affari Internazionali (IAI)". Historical Archives of the European Union (in Italian). Florence: European University Institute.
- Spinelli, Altiero (1989). Edmondo Paolini (ed.). Diario europeo 1948-1969 (in Italian). Bologna: Il Mulino. ISBN 978-88-15-01981-3.
- Spinelli, Altiero (1992). Edmondo Paolini (ed.). Diario europeo 1970-1976 (in Italian). Bologna: Il Mulino. ISBN 978-88-15-03760-2.

== See also ==
- Altiero Spinelli
- Foreign relations of Italy
- International affairs
- Think tank
