= Untrasried =

- Municipality
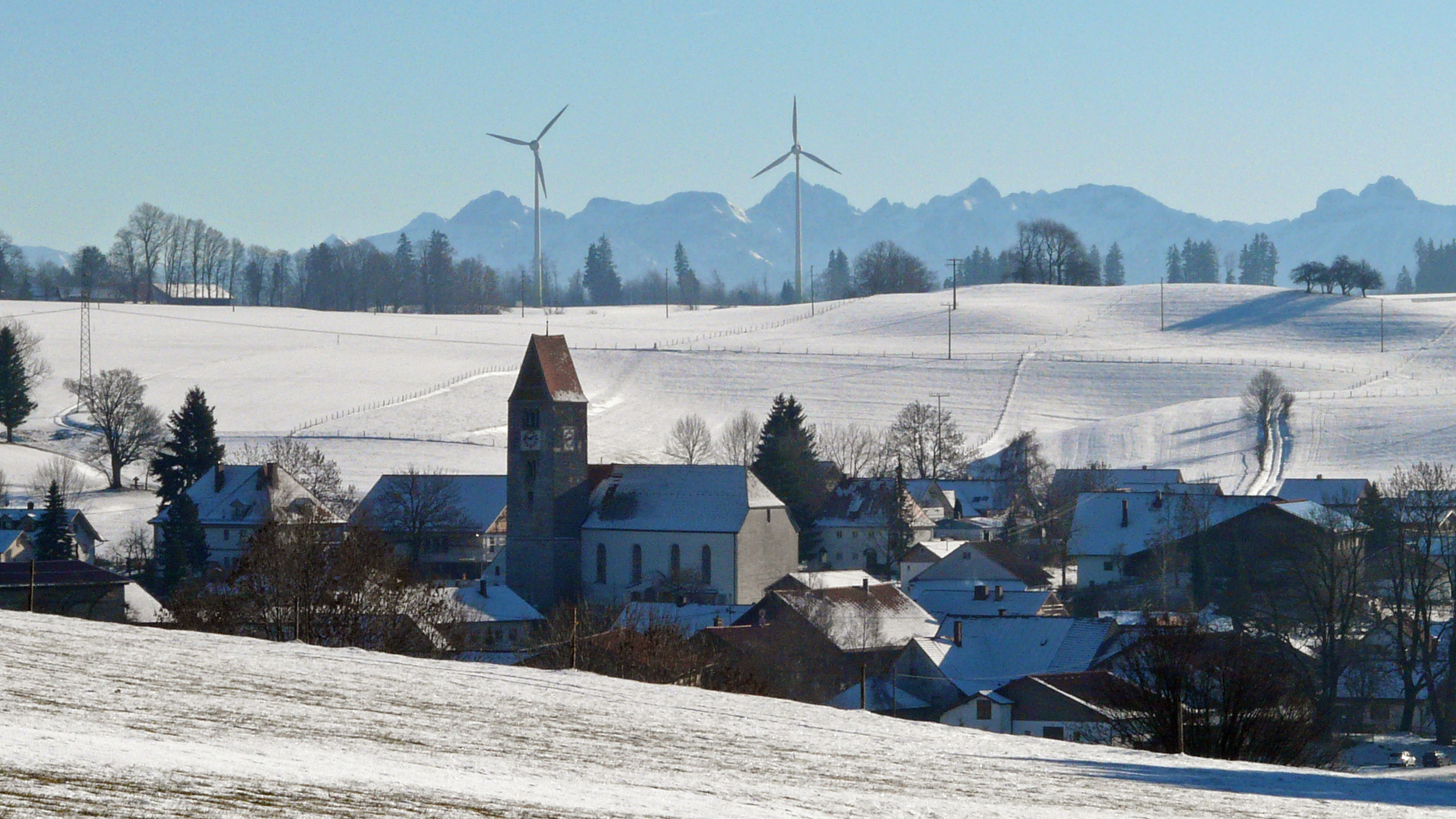
- Untrasried in winter

- Coat of arms

- Location of Untrasried within Ostallgäu district
- Interactive map of Untrasried
- Location within Germany Location within Bavaria
- Coordinates: 47°50′N 10°23′E
- Country: Germany
- State: Bavaria
- Admin. region: Schwaben
- District: Ostallgäu
- Municipal assoc.: Obergünzburg

Government
  - Mayor (2020–26): Alfred Wölfle

Area
  - Total: 25.75 km^{2} (9.94 sq mi)
- Elevation: 819 m (2,687 ft)

Population (2025-12-31)
  - Total: 1,680
  - Density: 65.2/km^{2} (169/sq mi)
- Time zone: UTC+01:00 (CET)
  - Summer (DST): UTC+02:00 (CEST)
- Postal codes: 87496
- Dialling codes: 08372
- Vehicle registration: OAL
- Website: www.untrasried.de

Untrasried (German pronunciation: [ˈʊntʁasʁiːt]) is a municipality in the district of Ostallgäu in Bavaria in Germany.
