= Obergünzburg =

- Municipality
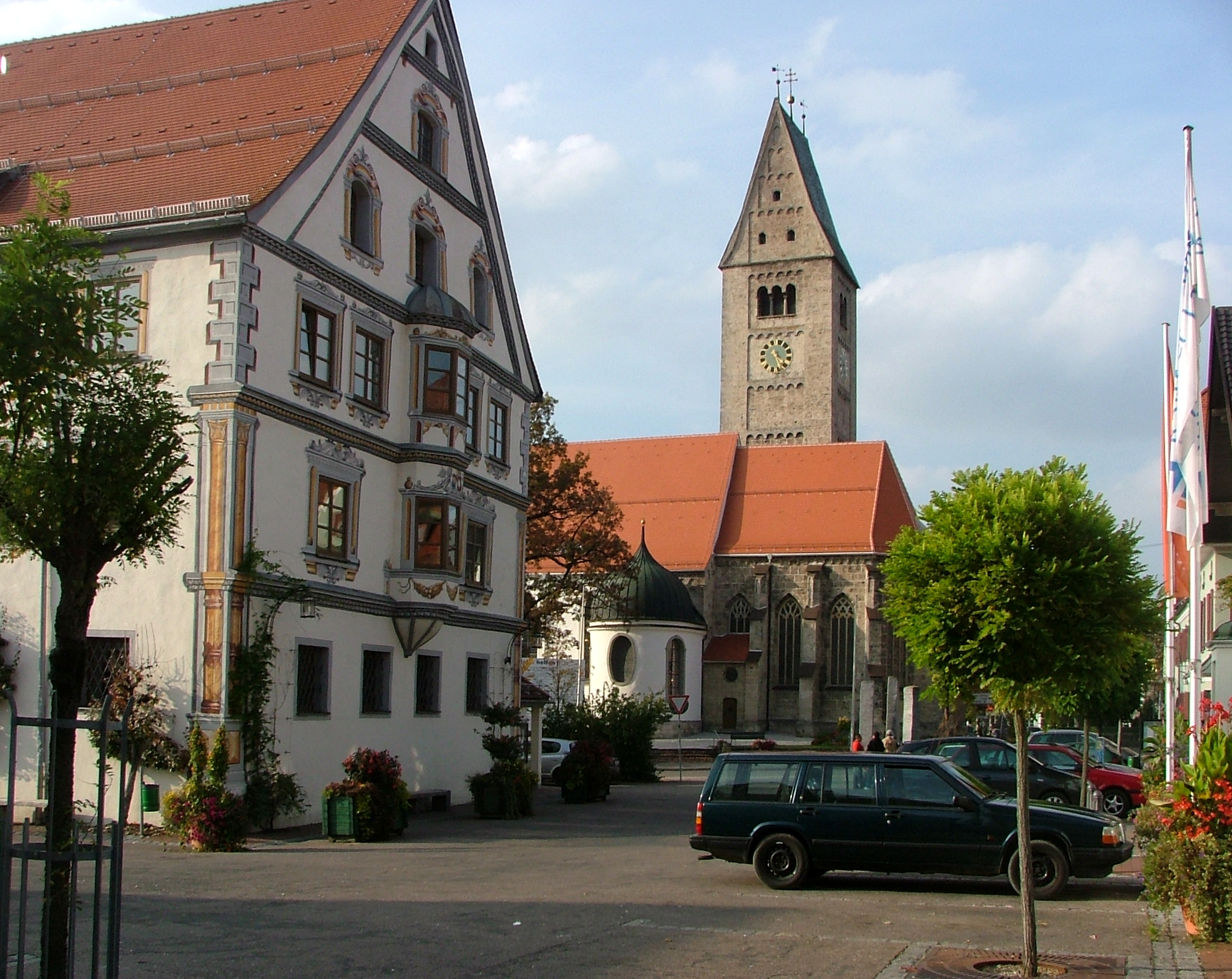
- Saint Martin parish church and town hall

- Coat of arms

- Location of Obergünzburg within Ostallgäu district
- Interactive map of Obergünzburg
- Location within Germany Location within Bavaria
- Coordinates: 47°51′N 10°25′E
- Country: Germany
- State: Bavaria
- Admin. region: Schwaben
- District: Ostallgäu
- Municipal assoc.: Obergünzburg

Government
  - Mayor (2020–26): Lars Leveringhaus (CSU)

Area
  - Total: 46.69 km^{2} (18.03 sq mi)
- Elevation: 737 m (2,418 ft)

Population (2025-12-31)
  - Total: 6,360
  - Density: 136/km^{2} (353/sq mi)
- Time zone: UTC+01:00 (CET)
  - Summer (DST): UTC+02:00 (CEST)
- Postal codes: 87634
- Dialling codes: 08372
- Vehicle registration: OAL
- Website: www.oberguenzburg.de

Obergünzburg (German pronunciation: [oːbɐˈɡʏntsbʊʁk]; Swabian: Obergenzburg) is a municipality in the district of Ostallgäu in Bavaria in Germany.
