= Dieter Spöri =

German politician

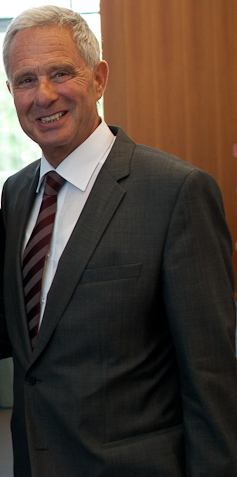
Dieter Spöri in 2012

Dieter Spöri (born 15 May 1943 in Stuttgart) is a German politician affiliated with the Social Democratic Party of Germany (SPD). He has been the president of the European Movement Germany since 2006, and was deputy prime minister and minister of economic affairs of the State of Baden-Württemberg from 1992 to 1996.

== Studies and early career ==
Spöri studied Economics at the University of Tübingen. After his graduation in 1969 he was a deputy head of the Institute of Südwestdeutsche Wirtschaftsforschung in Stuttgart from 1970 to 1974. Until 1975 he also worked as a lecturer in economic policy at the University of Stuttgart.

== Party and mandates ==
Spöri joined the SPD in 1970. Five years later he became a member of the party's State Board of Baden-Württemberg, where he remained for 23 years. Between 1988 and 1998 he also belonged to the party's federal board.

Between 1976 and 1988 Spöri was a member of the German Bundestag where he served as parliamentary party spokesman on taxation and umpire in the finance committee. In 1988 he returned to Baden-Württemberg and was elected to the Baden-Württemberg Landtag. Four years later he ran for the post of Prime Minister of Baden-Württemberg but lost to his opponent Erwin Teufel. In the following grand coalition he served as deputy prime minister and minister of economic affairs. Another four years later he ended his political career after the election since his party had to deal with the worst results in the state history. However, he is still rather active when it comes to discussing the future of the SPD.

== After the political career ==
In 1999 Spöri became head of corporate representative at the office for federal affairs of Daimler AG in Berlin. He also worked as head of external affairs and public policy for the enterprise since March 2008. He left Daimler AG by the end of the same year and afterwards joined PMC International AG to become senior vice president and shareholder.

== European politics ==
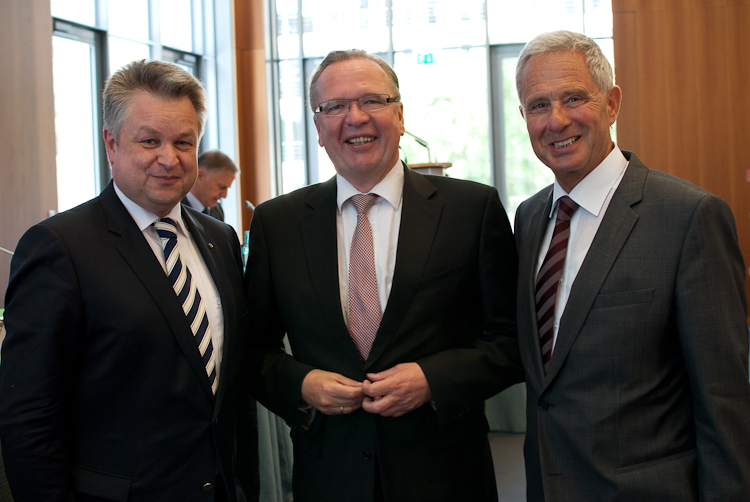
EBD's Honorary President Dieter Spöri (right) with his successor Rainer Wend (centre) with State Minister Michael Link (left)

During his active political career, he engaged in discussions concerning European politics. He raised awareness in the mid 1990s by expressing serious concerns about the implementation of the Euro. In his opinion, the strict fulfillment of the Maastricht Criteria had to be guaranteed by all means. Therefore, 1999 seemed to be too early for many European states. However, he urgently sought the compromise of a German-French monetary union (the only two states which would have fulfilled the criteria at that time) in order not to risk German jobs. He proposed to postpone the implementation of the monetary union for five years.

In 2011 he was interviewed by the news portal EurActiv. During this interview, he discussed his early concerns but also clearly opposed a possible Greek insolvency.

Since June 2006 he has been the president of the European Movement Germany. He followed the former EU Commissioner Monika Wulf-Mathies (re-election in 2008 and 2010).
