= Young European Federalists =

Political youth organization

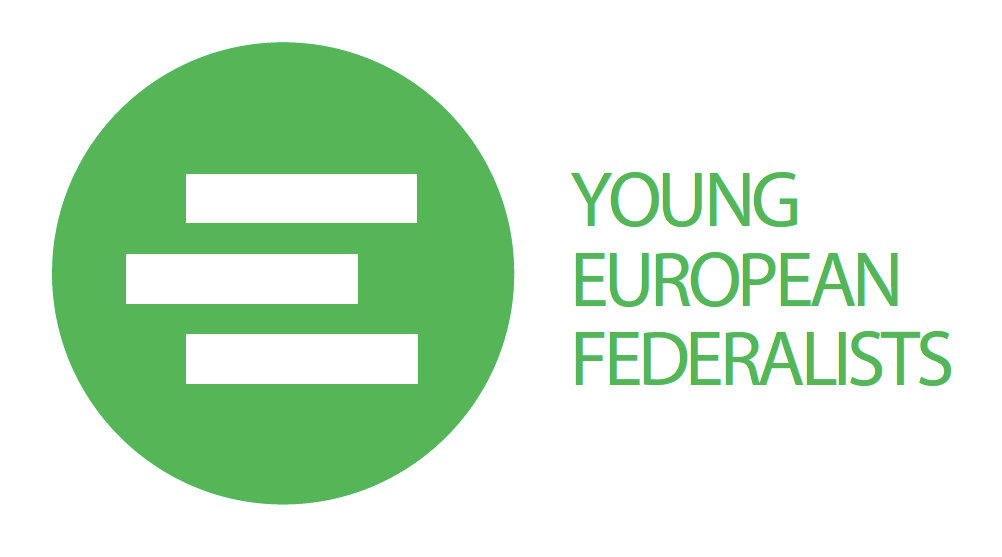
- Formation: 1972
- Type: Political Youth NGO
- Headquarters: Brussels, Belgium
- Location: Europe
- Official language: English
- Key people: Moritz Hergl (President); Christos Papagiannis (Secretary General)
- Website: jef.eu

Young European Federalists (French: Jeunes Européens Fédéralistes, JEF) is a political youth organisation. Active in most European countries, it seeks to promote European integration through the strengthening and democratisation of the European Union (EU). JEF has close ties to the European Movement and the Union of European Federalists and is a full member of the European Youth Forum (YFJ), as well as Generation Climate Europe.

Former activists of JEF can join the alumni association, Friends of JEF.

== History ==
First founded in the late 1940s, the constituent congress of the JEF at European level was held in Strasbourg on November 18th-19th 1950. It was a youth section of the Union of European Federalists with a European office set up in Paris in 1949. With the split within the federalist movement in the 1950s, there was no longer a European level JEF organisation until it was re-founded in the early 1970s, but the various JEF groups carried on with their work on local, regional and national levels.

In 1967, young federalists held mock negotiations in Brussels to work out a treaty of accession for the UK to the European Community. In March 1969 they organized a demonstration on the visitors gallery of the European Parliament to demand its direct elections by universal suffrage. In many European countries protest demonstrations were organised against the dictatorship in Greece. Those activities helped the first groups of young federalists to set up very close collaboration and to tighten their links again. The collaboration took concrete form in the creation of JEF's liaison office in 1970. It was there that the international association took the name of ‘Young European Federalists', and the founding congress was held in Luxembourg on 25 and 26 March 1972.

The JEF was still interested in the European Community, and in particular securing direct elections to the European Parliament, but new topics became increasingly important for JEF in the 1970s: east-west cooperation, disarmament, enlargement, women's rights, the environment and international development issues. The JEF engaged with other European youth organisations (political and non-political) to spread its views.

In 1984-85, when Altiero Spinelli persuaded the first elected European Parliament to draft and put forward a Treaty on European Union, and Jacques Delors became President of the European Commission and launched the idea of the single market, institutional reform of the European Community became a main focus of the JEF since it seemed that a real European democracy could be established in a short time. JEF said of itself, "Young Europeans, simply a generation ahead," which is still the JEF motto.

In the 1990s, three basic developments influenced the work and the discussions of JEF:

1. the return of nationalist wars in Europe in former Jugoslavia;
2. the crisis of legitimacy of the European integration process, highlighted by the Danish referendum in 1992, the lost Norwegian referendum in 1994 and the initially negative attitude of many EU citizens towards the euro;
3. the open questions on the enlargement of the European Union.

Since the 2000s, JEF Europe has worked a lot on institutional issues calling for a European federal constitution and a more democratic Europe. Another major area of interest for JEF is the defence of human rights and the respect of the state of law, especially with a yearly Belarus action since 2006.

== Goals ==
According to its statutes, JEF is a non-partisan and non-denominational European NGO. It advocates for a united Europe with a federal structure. At the centre of JEF's political program is the demand for a federal constitution for Europe, whose core element is a two-chamber Parliament (consisting of a directly elected chamber and a chamber of states). Hereby, JEF insists on the subsidiarity principle as a form of decentralized distribution of powers. Another key element is the demand for a unified foreign and security policy of the European Union. JEF is committed to comprehensive reform of the EU towards more democracy, participation, transparency, efficiency and sustainability. In addition to the policy objectives, the organisation tries in particular to promote European awareness among young people and encourage civic activism.

== Activities ==
JEF spreads its ideas by the following means:

Campaigns to lobby over a longer period of time for a specific federalist cause.
Street actions mobilising the entire network to raise awareness of burning European issues among the general public. (Most notably the annual Free Belarus street action, taking place in numerous cities Europe- and worldwide since 2006)
International events such as seminars and trainings on a wide range of topics in different EU and non-EU countries.
A multilingual, interactive webzine thenewfederalist where youth can voice their opinion in articles on current European affairs.
Projects that implement a specific goal and for which specific funding was received.
Press releases for the advocacy of JEF's objectives towards both public and private organisations.

Consequently, the organisation encourages debate on European affairs and EU policies while fostering youth mobility and exchanges throughout the continent, thus seeking to involve European Citizens, in particular young people, from all across the continent in the process of European integration.

== Organisation ==
JEF has about 15,000 members in 31 widely autonomous national sections, which are coordinated by a European umbrella organisation, JEF Europe.

== JEF Europe ==
JEF Europe is an International association without lucrative purpose (IVZW/AISBL) under Belgian law. The European Secretariat is based in Brussels.

=== The European Congress ===
The highest decision-making body of JEF is the European Congress, which meets every two years in a different city. The delegates are elected by the members of national sections or their representatives in proportion to the number of members of each section.

The Congress elects the President and two Vice Presidents, a Treasurer, 4 members of the executive board as well as 16 directly elected members of the Federal Committee.

- 1972 Luxembourg (founding) (Luxembourg)
- 1974 Luxembourg
- 1975 Innsbruck (Austria)
- 1977 Berlin (Germany)
- 1979 Sundvollen (Norway)
- 1981 Milan (Italy)
- 1983 The Hague (Netherlands)
- 1985 Berlin
- 1987 Canterbury (United Kingdom)
- 1989 Opheylissem (Belgium)
- 1991 Hurdalsjøen (Norway)
- 1992 Vejle (extraordinary) (Denmark)
- 1993 Munich (Germany)
- 1995 Milan (Italy)
- 1997 Bruges (Belgium)
- 1999 Marly-le-Roi (France)
- 2001 Vienna (Austria)
- 2003 Stockholm (Sweden)
- 2005 Strasbourg (France)
- 2007 Copenhagen (Denmark)
- 2009 Florence (Italy)
- 2011 Helsinki (Finland)
- 2013 Paris (France)
- 2015 Zürich (Switzerland)
- 2017 Valletta (Malta)
- 2019 Paris (France)
- 2021 Liège (Belgium)
- 2023 Madrid (Spain)
- 2025 Strasbourg (France)

=== The Federal Committee ===
The Federal Committee (FC) meets twice a year and is composed by the President, the two Vice Presidents, the four executive board members and 16 members directly elected by the Congress, and a number of national representatives corresponding appointed by each of the national member sections. The Secretary General participates in the meeting without a voting right.

The Federal Committee is chaired by a presidium of three members and adopts the political and strategical guidelines and oversees the activity of the executive board.

=== The Executive Board ===
The executive board (EB) is chaired by the President and includes the two Vice Presidents, the Secretary General, the Treasurer, and four board members. It is responsible for the implementation of the external and internal policy resolutions adopted by the Congress and the Federal Committee and the management of the organisation.

It meets at least four times every year.

=== Presidents ===
- Since 2025: Moritz Hergl
- 2023-2025: Christelle Savall
- 2021-2023: Antonio Argenziano
- 2019-2021: Leonie Martin
- 2015-2019: Christopher Glück
- 2011-2015: Pauline Gessant
- 2009-2011: Philippe Adriaenssens
- 2007-2009: Samuele Pii
- 2005-2007: Jan Seifert
- 2003-2005: Jon Worth
- 2001-2003: Alison Weston
- 1999-2001: Paolo Vacca
- 1997-1999: Philip Savelkoul
- 1995-1997: Ugo Ferruta
- 1993-1995: Tor Eigil Hodne
- 1991-1993: Stephen Woodard
- 1989-1991: Giannis Papageorgiou
- 1989: Pascal Herroelen
- 1987-1989: Lars Erik Nordgaard
- 1985-1987: Manfred Auster
- 1983-1985: Franco Spoltore
- 1981-1983: David Grace
- 1979-1981: Richard Corbett
- 1977-1978: Jean Jacques Anglade
- 1976-1977: Flor van de Velde
- 1974-1976: Julian Priestley
- 1972-1974: Peter Osten

=== Secretaries General ===
- Since 2025: Christos Papagiannis
- 2024-2025 Brigita Krasniqi
- 2022-2024: Judit Lantai
- 2018-2022: Milosh Ristovski
- 2016-2018: Valentin Dupouey
- 2014-2016: Ioan Bucuras
- 2013-2014: Federico Guerrieri
- 2012: Stefan Manevski
- 2010-2012: Ruben Loodts
- 2008-2010: Peter Matjašič
- 2006-2008: Vassilis Stamogiannis
- 2004-2006: Joan Marc Simon
- 2002-2004: Marianne Bonnard
- 2000-2002: Niki Klesl
- 1998-2000: Laura Davis
- 1996-1998: Tobias Flessenkemper
- 1994-1996: Ingo Linsenmann
- 1992-1994: Bernd Hüttemann
- 1992: Soraya Usmani Martinez
- 1989-1991: Irmeli Karhio
- 1987-1989: Monica Frassoni
- 1985-1987 Giannis Papageorgiou
- 1984-1985: Susana Roson
- 1982-1984: Tore Nedrebø
- 1981-1982: Eva Finzi
- 1980-1981: David Grace
- 1977-1980: Jacques Vantomme
- 1975-1977: Gerda Grootjes

== Notable alumni ==
Several current and former influential members of the European Parliament (MEPs), including Richard Corbett and Jo Leinen (PES), Tom Spencer (Conservative) and Monica Frassoni (Greens), and its former Secretary General Sir Julian Priestley served as JEF officers in their teens and twenties. The former Swedish Prime Minister and Foreign Minister Carl Bildt was a vice president.

== See also ==
- European Movement
- Union of European Federalists
- Federalism
- Federalist flag
- Centre for Studies on Federalism
- Young European Movement UK
