= Institute for European Politics =

NGO in Berlin, Germany

- Formation: 1959; 67 years ago
- Type: Policy research
- Location: Berlin
- Website: IEP

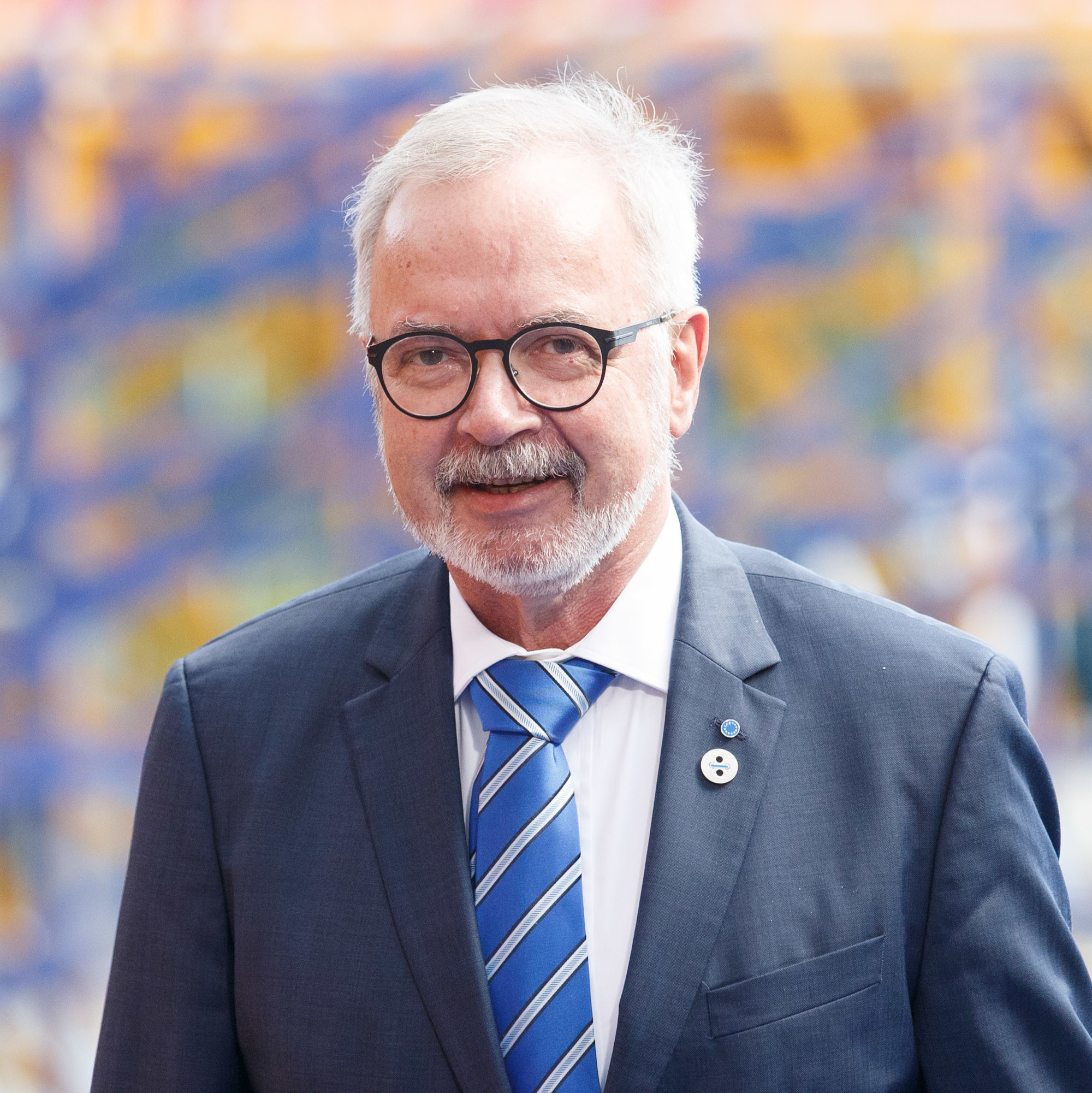
IEP president Werner Hoyer

The Institute for European Politics (IEP; German: Institut für Europäische Politik) is a German foreign and European policy research centre based in Berlin. It is an independent non-governmental organization focused on the research of European integration.

The IEP was founded in 1959, being one of the earliest foreign and European policy research centres in Germany. It is a strategic partner of the German Federal Foreign Office and the European Commission, as well as a founding member of the Trans-European Policy Studies Association (TEPSA).

Its current president is Werner Hoyer, the former President of the European Investment Bank (EIB).

== Research ==
In its analysis, the IEP aims to combine the study of current political developments with a broader look at long-term trends of development within European integration policy. The institute's research activities currently focus on three areas:

- The Future of European Integration
- EU Enlargement, Neighborhood, and Central Asia
- Germany and Europe

These topics are explored through research projects, workshops and conferences, EU traineeship programmes, as well as the publication of scholarly material.

Further, these topics are explored in the IEP's summer school and study programmes. In cooperation with the French Centre international de formation européenne, the IEP conducts the English-language PhD support programme EUCACIS ("The EU, Central Asia and the Caucasus in the International System").

== Platforms for discourse ==
One of the institute's main goals is the fostering of dialogue on European politics between political decision makers, scientists, journalists and civil society. Different programmes, like the IEP's Europagespräche (German for "Talks on Europe") or bilateral formats like the German-Portuguese Forum and the German-Nordic-Baltic Forum.

== Capacity Development ==
Next to its research of European integration, the IEP's Department of Capacity Development works on the sustainable strengthening of public administration capacities in southeastern Europe to strengthen their ties to the EU. Projects include assistance during EU qualification processes and discussions. In this field, the IEP works together closely with international partners and the German Agency for International Cooperation (GIZ).

== Funding ==
Major sponsors of IEP are governmental agencies, foundations, donations and project-related income. The European Union and the German Federal Foreign Office also support the IEP.

== Publications ==
Next to a wide breadth of scholarly publication on specific topics, the IEP publishes the following recurring publications:

- Yearbook of European Integration
- Europa von A bis Z (German: Europe from A to Z)
- Integration (quarterly academic journal)
- Europäische Schriften (German: European Writings)
