= Hungerbach =

Hungerbach may refer to:

- Hungerbach (Altmühl), a river of Bavaria, Germany, tributary of the Altmühl
- Hungerbach (Gennach), a river of Bavaria, Germany, tributary of the Gennach
