= Caspar Aquila =

German Lutheran theologian and reformer

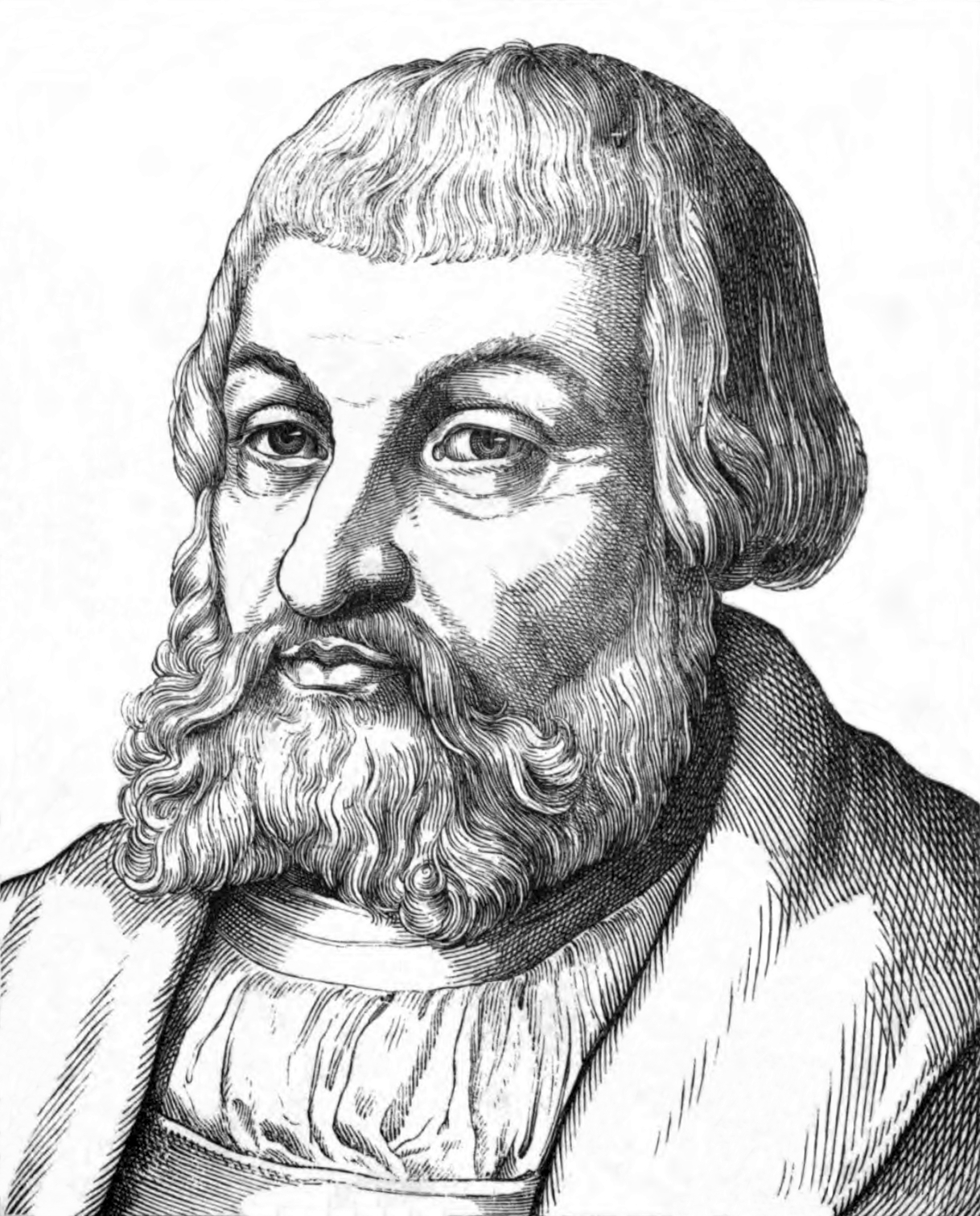
Caspar Aquila illustration from 19th century

Caspar Aquila (sometimes Kaspar or Gaspar Aquila; 7 August 1488 – 12 November 1560), born Johann Kaspar Adler, was a German Lutheran theologian and reformer.

== Biography ==
He was born at Augsburg, and educated there, at Ulm (1502), in Italy (he met Erasmus in Rome), at Bern (1508), and studied theology in Leipzig (1510) and Wittenberg (1513). According to his son, he entered the ministry in August 1514, while at Bern. He was for some time a military chaplain.

In 1516, he became pastor of Jengen, near Augsburg, where he introduced ideas of the Reformation. Openly proclaiming his adhesion to Martin Luther's doctrine, he was imprisoned for half a year (1520 or 1522) at Dillingen, by order of the bishop of Augsburg; a death sentence was commuted to banishment through the influence of Isabella, wife of Christian II of Denmark and sister of Charles V. Returning to Wittenberg, he met Luther, and acted as tutor to the sons of Franz von Sickingen at Ebernburg castle. After the siege of the Ebernburg by Richard Greiffenklau, the archbishop of Trier, on 6 June 1523, he returned to Wittenberg to teach Hebrew, and aided Luther in his version of the Old Testament.

The dates and particulars of his career are uncertain until 1527, when he became pastor at Saalfeld, an office which Luther procured for him. In 1528, he was superintendent. He wrote Christliche Bedenken auf das Interim (Christian thoughts on the Interim, 1548), and Das Interim illuminiert (The Interim illuminated, 1548) in vehement opposition to the Augsburg Interim, and a warrant was put on his head by Charles V. This led him to take temporary shelter at Rudolstadt with Catherine, countess of Schwarzburg. In 1550, he was appointed dean of the Collegiatstift in Schmalkalden. Here he had a controversy with Andreas Osiander. Restored to Saalfeld after the peace of Passau, not without opposition, in 1552, he remained there, still engaged in controversy, until his death at Saalfeld.

He was twice married, and left four sons.

== Works ==
He published numerous sermons, a few Old Testament expositions and some controversial tracts. Besides the works mentioned above, other notable titles are:

- Christliche Erklärung des kleinen Katechismus etc. (A Christian explanation of the Little Catechism, etc., Augsburg, 1538)
- Fragstücke der ganzen christlichen Lehre (Questions on the entire Christian teaching; since 1547 many editions)
