= Alpina B3 (E46) =

German sports car

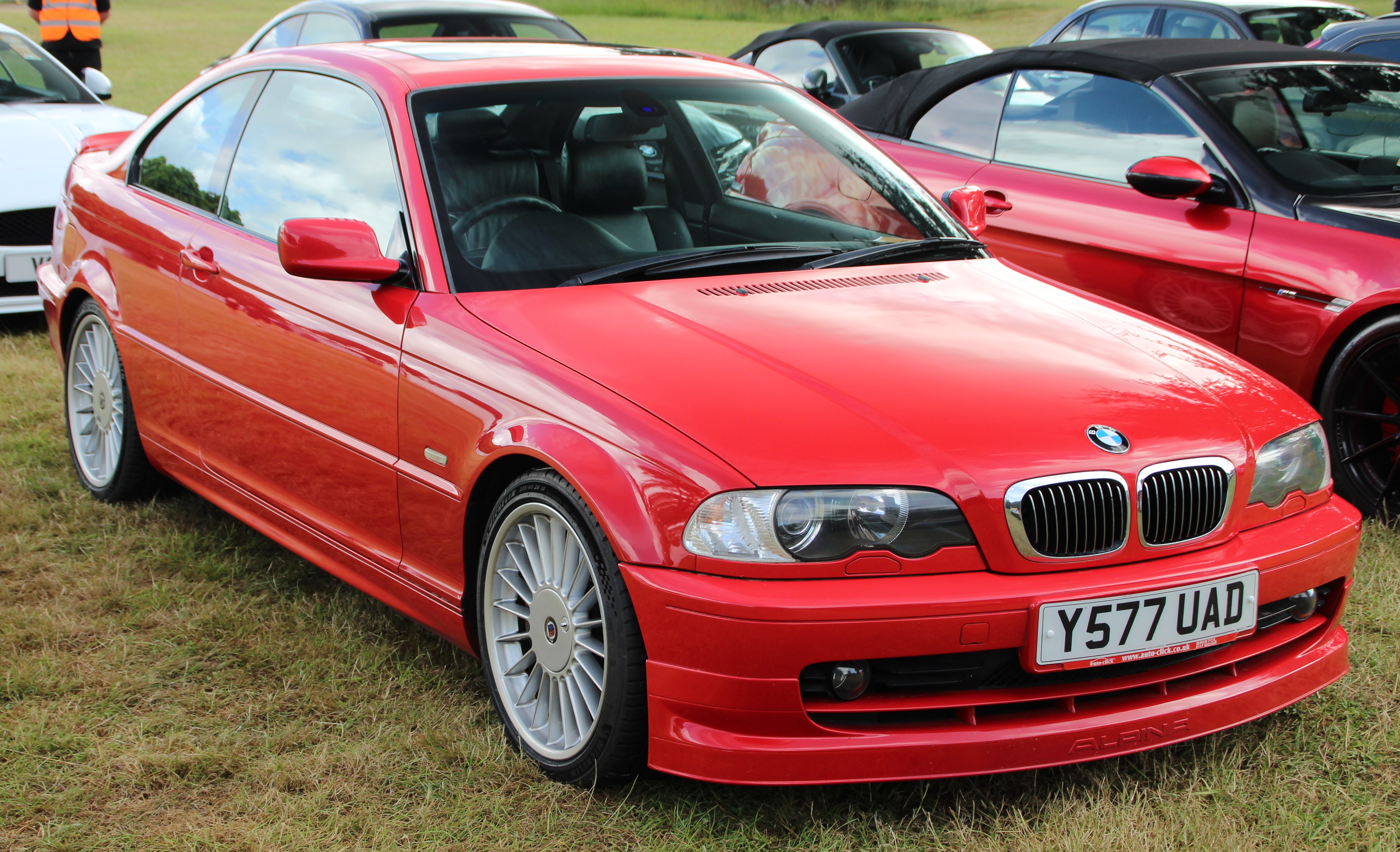
- Alpina B3 coupé

Overview
- Manufacturer: Alpina
- Production: 1999–2006
- Assembly: Germany: Buchloe

Body and chassis
- Class: Compact executive car (D)
- Body style: 2-door coupé; 2-door retractable hard top convertible; 4-door saloon; 5-door station wagon
- Layout: Front-engine, rear-wheel-drive
- Related: BMW 3 Series (E46)

Powertrain
- Engine: 3.4 L E5/1 I6
- Transmission: 6-speed Getrag manual; 5-speed automatic

Dimensions
- Wheelbase: 2,720 mm (107.1 in)
- Length: 4,470–4,490 mm (176.0–176.8 in)
- Width: 1,740–1,810 mm (68.5–71.3 in)
- Height: 1,410–1,440 mm (55.5–56.7 in)

Chronology
- Predecessor: Alpina B3 (E36)
- Successor: Alpina B3 (E90)

The Alpina B3 and B3 S is a series of high performance compact executive cars manufactured by German automobile manufacturer Alpina from 1999 to 2006 based on the BMW 3 Series (E46). The B3 was available in coupé, saloon, convertible and station wagon body styles. The more powerful B3 S was introduced at the 2002 Paris Motor Show.

== Specifications (B3 S) ==
The engine is a hand-built 3.4-litre E5/1 inline-6 unit, also shared with the Alpina Roadster S. The engine is an enlarged version of the S52B32 engine first installed in the North American M3 (E36). The engine generated a maximum power output of 309 PS (227 kW; 305 hp) at 6,300 rpm and 362 N⋅m (267 lb⋅ft) of torque at 4,800 rpm, with a redline of 7,300 rpm. Modifications to the engine include an Alpina specific cylinder head, crankshaft and high strength MAHLE pistons.

The B3 S was available either with a 5-speed Switch-Tronic automatic transmission or a 6-speed manual transmission built by Getrag as standard. Noticeable changes to the interior include Alpina logos and badges, Alpina door sills, and heated sports seats. The comforts options offered by BMW were included as standard in the interior. The exterior changes include a front chin spoiler, 18-inch Alpina alloy wheels wrapped in Michelin Pilot Sport tyres measuring 225/40 R18 on the front and 255/35 R18 on the rear, and "B3 S" badging at the rear. Changes to the suspension system consisted of Alpina specific dampers and Eibach springs with no other major changes.

== Gallery ==
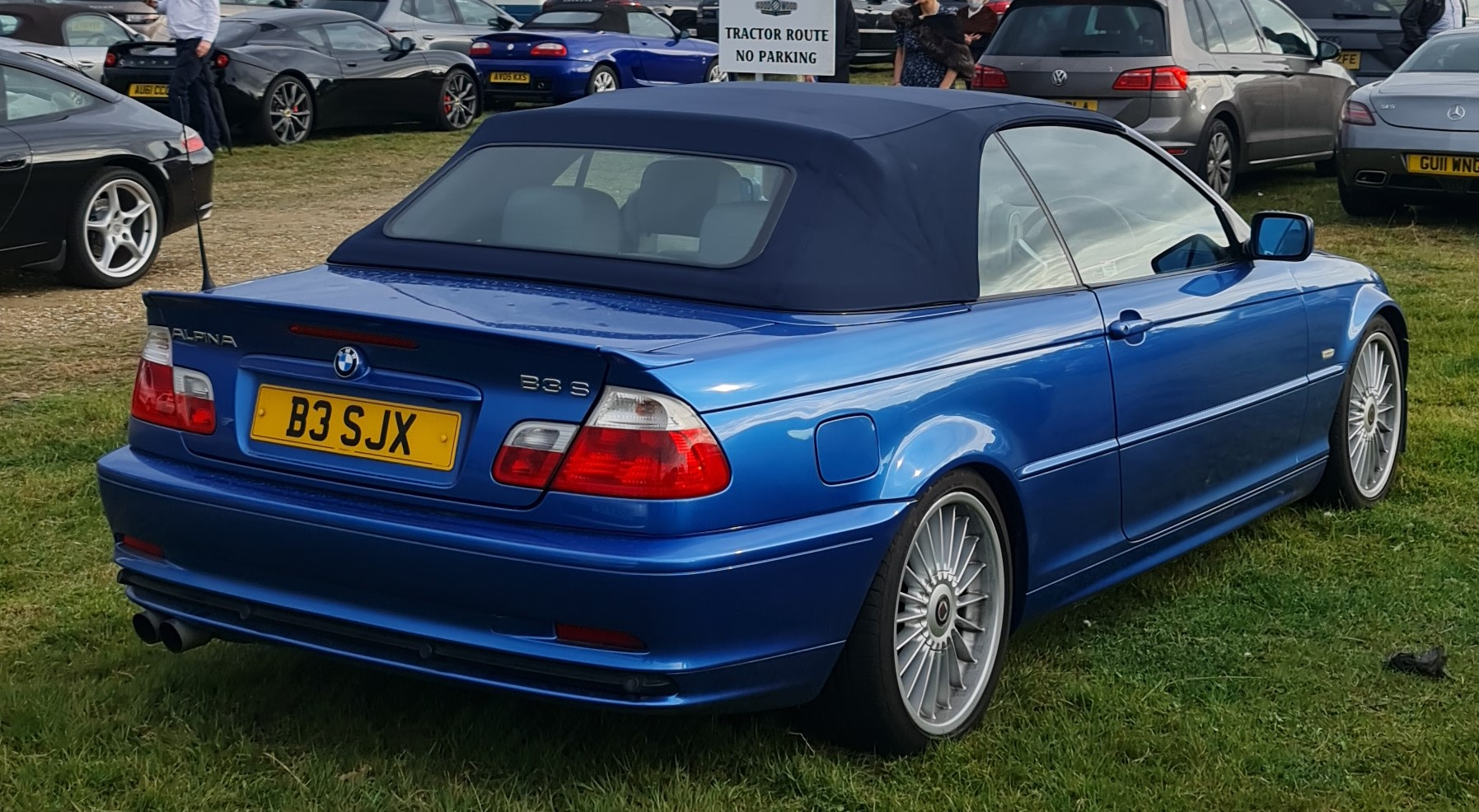
Alpina B3 S cabriolet

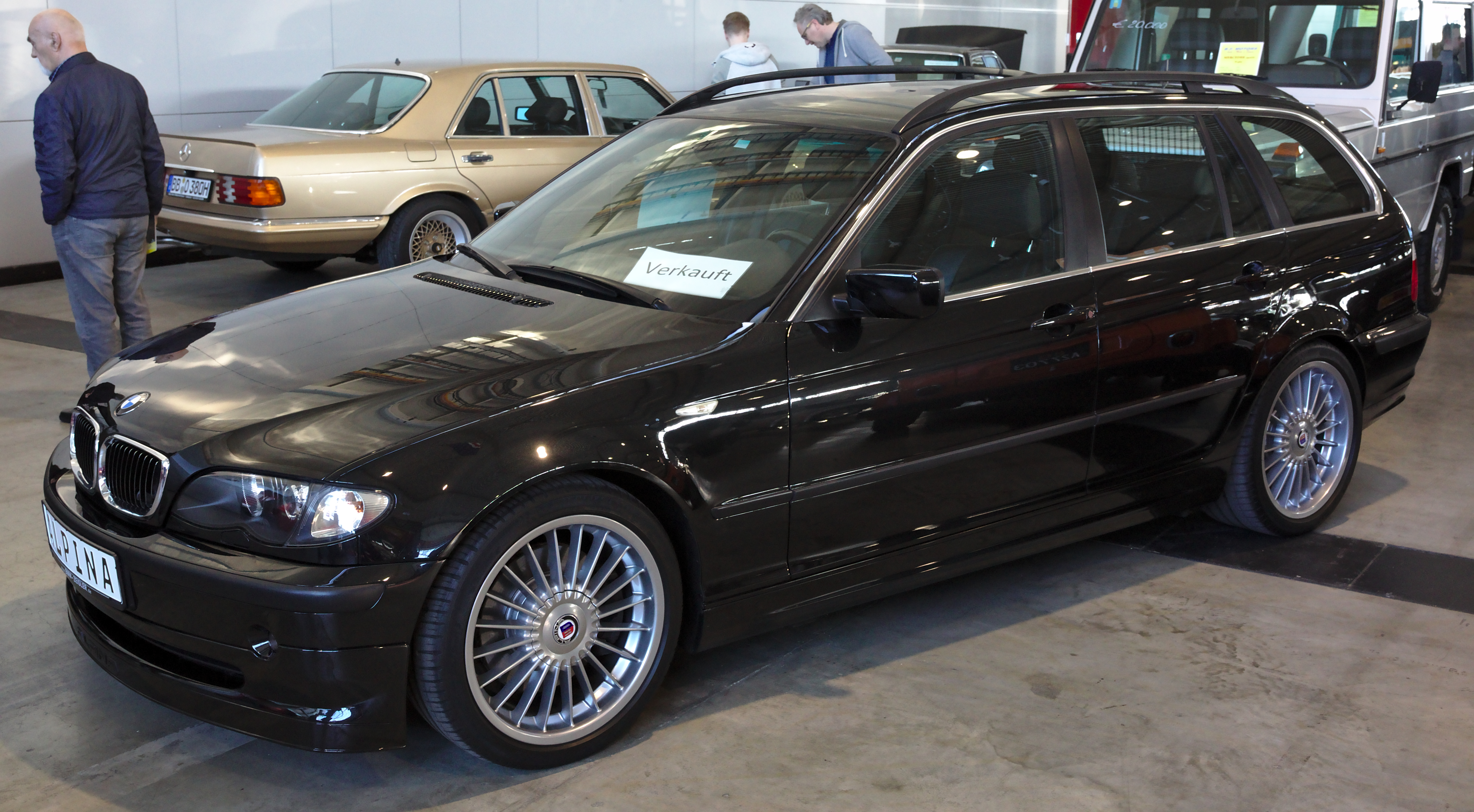
Alpina B3 Touring
