= Alpina Roadster S =

German sports car

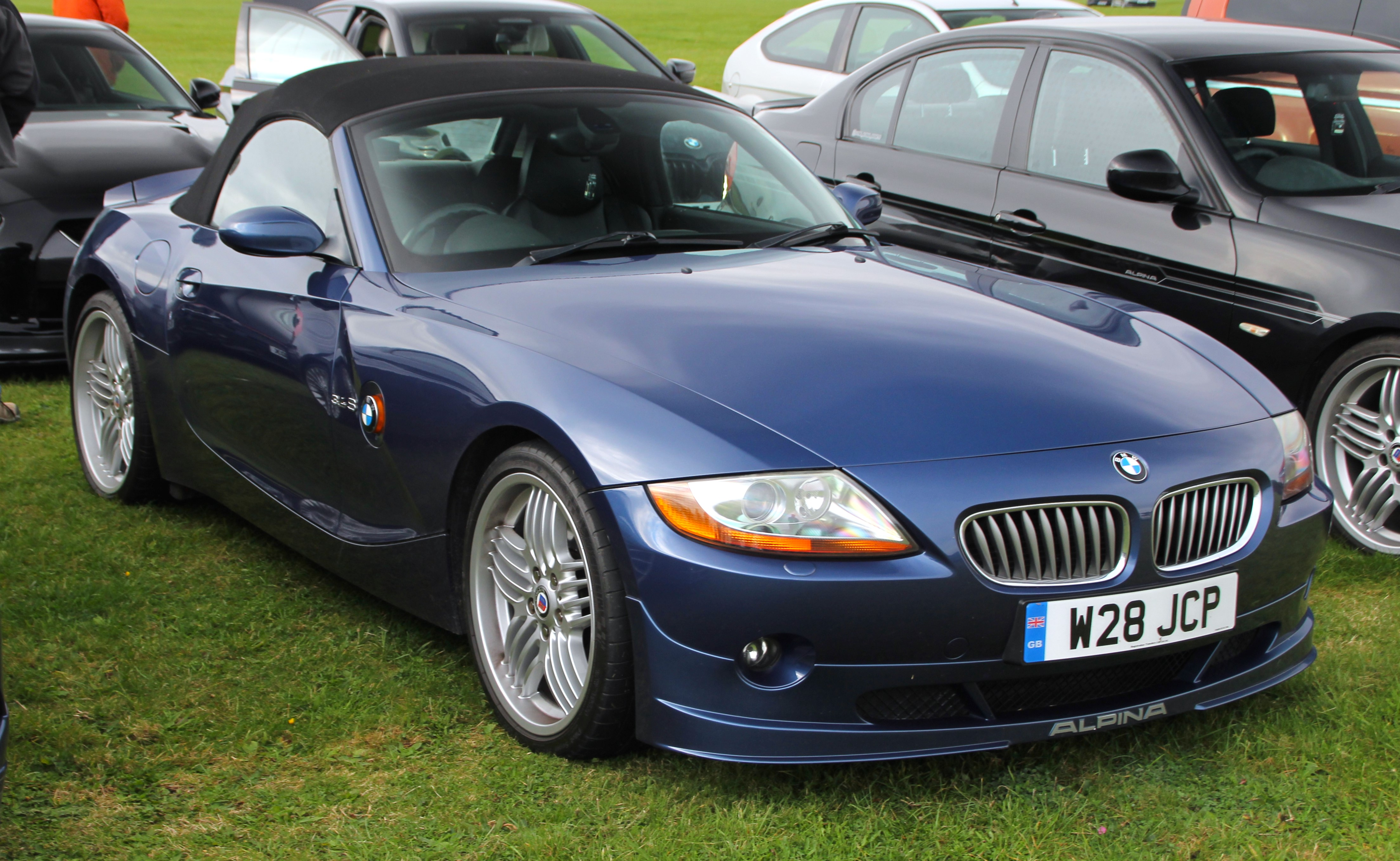
- Alpina Roadster S

Overview
- Manufacturer: Alpina Burkard Bovensiepen GmbH & Co. KG
- Production: 2004–2006
- Assembly: Germany: Buchloe

Body and chassis
- Class: Sports car (S)
- Body style: 2-door roadster
- Layout: Front-engine, rear-wheel-drive
- Related: BMW Z4 (E85); Alpina B3 (E46)

Powertrain
- Engine: 3.4 L E5/2 I6
- Transmission: 6-speed ZF manual

Dimensions
- Wheelbase: 2,495 mm (98.2 in)
- Length: 4,090 mm (161.0 in)
- Width: 1,780 mm (70.1 in)
- Height: 1,300 mm (51.2 in)
- Curb weight: 1,320 kg (2,910 lb) (DIN)

The Alpina Roadster S is a sports car manufactured by the German automobile manufacturer Alpina from 2003 to 2007. Based on the BMW Z4 (E85), the Roadster S was unveiled at the 2003 Frankfurt Motor Show.

== Specifications ==
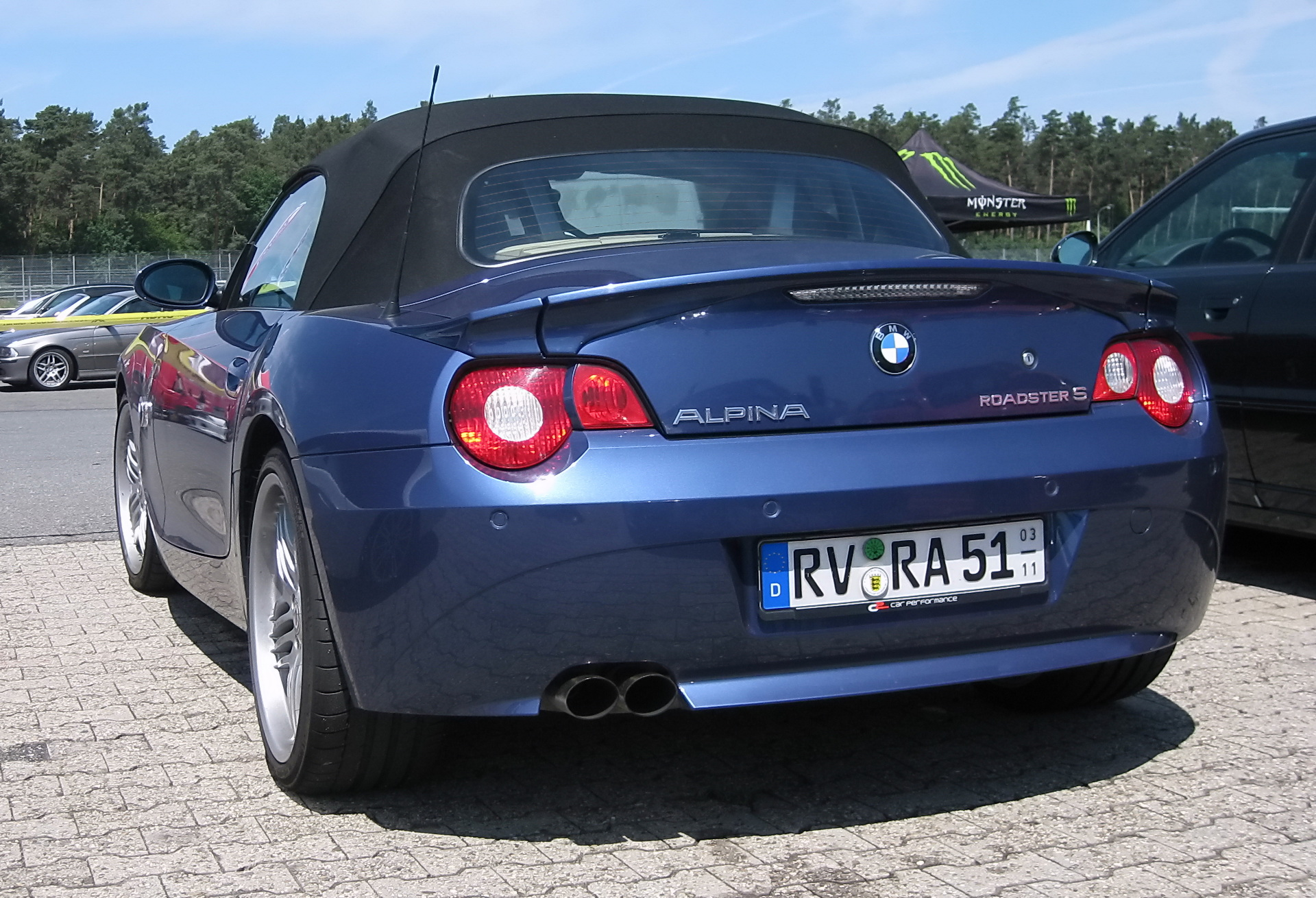
Rear view

The Roadster S was the third open top sports car presented by Alpina after the Alpina Z1 RLE (Roadster Limited Edition) and V8 Roadster which was unveiled in 2001. The Roadster S was based on the Z4 3.0i and was available in two trims, those being standard and Luxury. The Luxury model had Bluetooth phone connectivity, DVD satellite navigation and Xenon headlamps. The optional Sport pack added a thicker anti-rollbar and increased the front negative camber by 1 degree.

The engine is a hand-built 3.4-litre E5/2 inline-six unit, also shared with the B3 S (E46). The engine is an enlarged version of the S52B32 engine first installed in the North American M3 (E36). The engine generated a maximum power output of 300 PS (221 kW; 296 hp) at 6,300 rpm and 360 N⋅m (266 lb⋅ft) of torque at 4,800 rpm. The engine has a redline of 7,200 rpm. Modifications to the engine include an Alpina specific cylinder head, crankshaft and high strength Mahle pistons. The exhaust system is a stainless steel unit from Boysen with dual polished exhaust tips.

Interestingly for a modern Alpina automobile, the Roadster S did away with the Switch Tronic automatic transmission and has a close ratio 6-speed manual transmission built by ZF Friedrichshafen. The decision to replace the automatic transmission was primarily made to make the car more engaging to drive. This move was lauded by the purists and resulted in a positive response.

The interior was available in three colour combinations, those being black leather with blue and green stitching on the dashboard and steering wheel (or alternatively red stitching), red leather with red stitching on the dashboard and steering wheel and beige with maroon piping and maroon stitching on the dashboard and steering wheel. Noticeable changes to the interior include an Alpina blue instrument cluster, Alpina logos and badges, Alpina door sills, an overhead plaque signifying the production number of the car and heated sports seats. The creature comforts offered by BMW as an option were included as standard on the interior. The company made over 2,000 modifications to the redesigned interior in total.

The exterior changes include a front chin spoiler with Alpina lettering, a three piece rear lip spoiler, 18-inch Alpina Dynamic alloy wheels (4 set of spokes in a 5 spoke design; 19-inch wheels in the Luxury trim) wrapped in Michelin Pilot Sport tyres measuring 235/35 R19 on the front and 265/30 R19 on the rear and "Roadster S" badging at the rear and "3.4 S" badging on the front quarter-panels. The car was available in Alpina Blue (available at a premium), Sterling Grey, Japan Red (the launch colour of the car), Black Sapphire, Titanium Silver, Royal Red and Maldives Blue exterior colours. A very limited number of only five cars were produced in Toledo Blue. The Roadster S was also available with an optional hard top.

The suspension system consisted of Alpina specific BMW M-dampers and Eibach springs on the front and original BMW springs on the back, with no other major changes.

== Performance ==
The Roadster S can accelerate from 0–97 km/h (0–60 mph) in 5.1 seconds, 0–100 km/h (0–62 mph) in 5.3 seconds, 0–161 km/h (0–100 mph) in 13 seconds and can reach a claimed top speed of 272 km/h (169 mph) (277 km/h (172 mph) with the optional hard top). Although independent testing revealed the top speed to be as high as 257 km/h (160 mph).

== Production ==
The Roadster S' body-in-white was prepared at the BMW factory in Spartanburg, Greer, South Carolina and were sent to the Alpina factory in Buchloe for final assembly. In addition, the Roadster S was also produced by modifying a Z4 3.0i by stripping off the standard interior and installing an Alpina specific interior, modifying its engine and installing Alpina specific components. Europe production for the Roadster S was carried out for only two years (in 2004 and 2005) with 370 cars built in total, 167 of which were right-hand-drive for the UK market. The reason behind the short production span was that the S52 engine was not compliant with the new Euro 4 emission regulations coming into effect from January 2006 due to which BMW stopped supplying engines to Alpina. The car was still sold through 2006 via dealership inventories.
