= Lamerdingen =

- Municipality
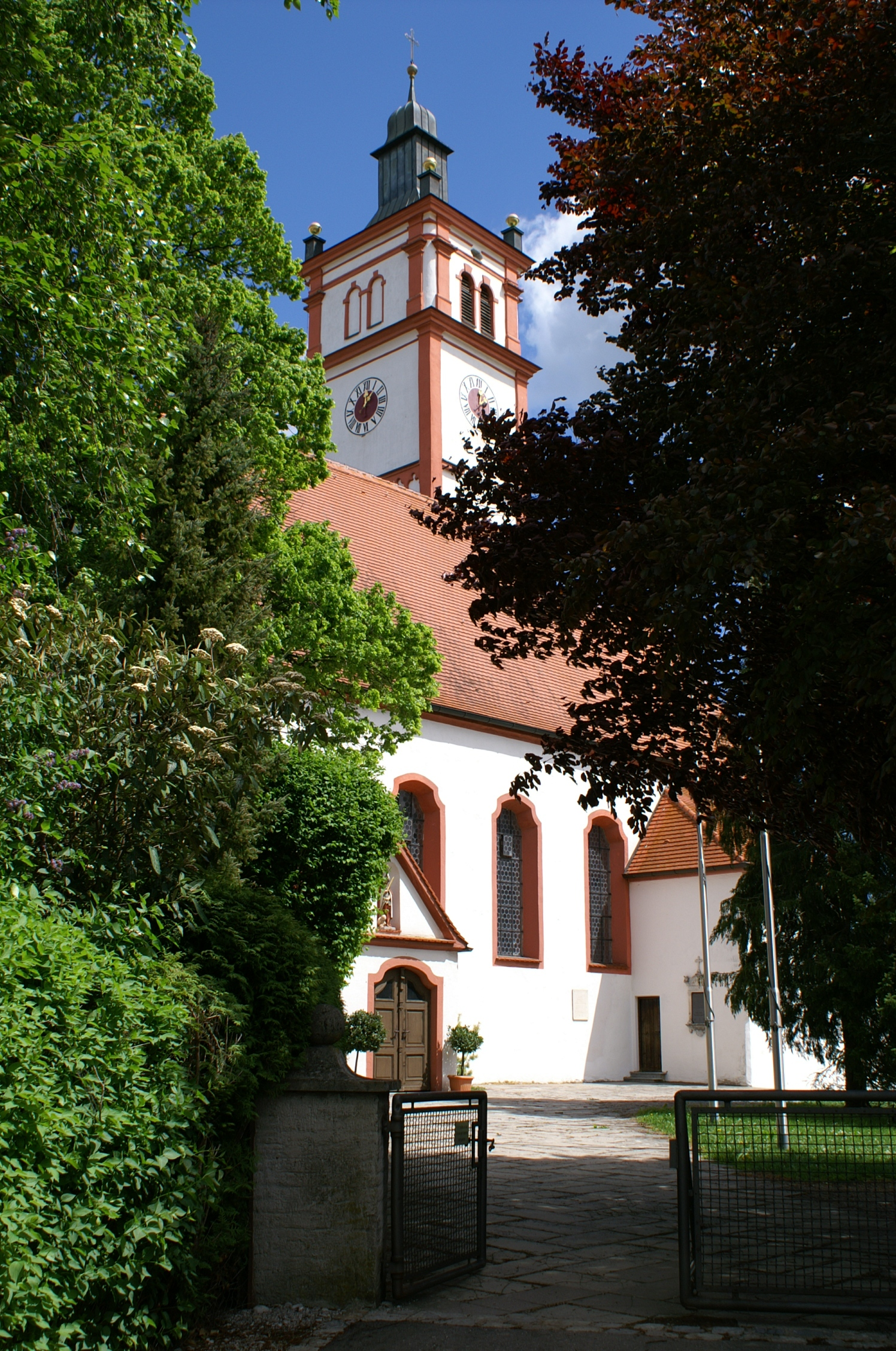
- Saint Martin Church

- Coat of arms

- Location of Lamerdingen within Ostallgäu district
- Interactive map of Lamerdingen
- Location within Germany Location within Bavaria
- Coordinates: 48°5′N 10°44′E
- Country: Germany
- State: Bavaria
- Admin. region: Schwaben
- District: Ostallgäu
- Municipal assoc.: Buchloe

Government
  - Mayor (2026–32): Winfried Kastl

Area
  - Total: 34.24 km^{2} (13.22 sq mi)
- Elevation: 596 m (1,955 ft)

Population (2025-12-31)
  - Total: 2,230
  - Density: 65.1/km^{2} (169/sq mi)
- Time zone: UTC+01:00 (CET)
  - Summer (DST): UTC+02:00 (CEST)
- Postal codes: 86862
- Dialling codes: 08241, 08248
- Vehicle registration: OAL
- Website: www.lamerdingen.de

Lamerdingen is a municipality in the district of Ostallgäu in Bavaria in Germany. The town has a municipal association with Buchloe. It is the northernmost municipality of the district of Ostallgäu.

== Geography ==
It consists of five villages:

- Dillishausen
- Großkitzighofen
- Kleinkitzighofen
- Lamerdingen
- Nassenwang

The isolated settlements Eschenlohmühle and Weiß are part of the village Dillishausen, the isolated settlements Kreuzhof, Nieshof and Schmidhof are part of the village Lamerdingen.

Adjoining to the municipality Lamerdingen are the following municipalities (ordered clock-wise, starting from the North):

- Langerringen (District of Augsburg)
- Hurlach (District of Landsberg am Lech)
- Igling (District of Landsberg am Lech)
- Buchloe (District of Ostallgäu)
- Amberg (District of Unterallgäu)
- Ettringen (District of Unterallgäu)

== History ==
Lamerdingen is considered to be an early Alemannic settlement. Indications of this insclude its location next to a very old road, which leads through numerous villages whose names end with -ingen.

Further evidence of the Alemannic settlement is the name Lamerdingen, which gradually formed from Lademutinga, meaning "by the people of Lademout". It further developed to Lademütingen/-matingen in the 11th and 12th centuries. In the 16th century it started being occasionally referred to as Lamerdingen, which is the predominantly used name from the 19th century until today.

As part of the territorial reform, the (until then independent) municipalities of Dillishausen, Kleinkitzighofen and Großkitzighofen were incorporated into the municipality of Lamerdingen on the 1st of May 1987.

== Politics ==
On 8 March 2026, Winfried Kastl was elected mayor as successor of Manuel Fischer. Helmut Herz was elected deputy mayor, as successor of Winfried Kastl, who promoted to mayor.

The municipal council consists of 14 elected members. Of those members, six members are part of the electoral group Vier Orte eine Gemeinde and two members respectively for the electoral communities Lamerdingen, Großkitzighofen, Kleinkitzighofen and Dillishausen.
