= Dietfurt (disambiguation) =

Dietfurt may refer to the following places:

- Dietfurt, a town in Upper Palatinate, Bavaria, Germany
- Dietfurt in Mittelfranken, a village in Middle Franconia, Bavaria, Germany
- Dietfurt, Toggenburg, Switzerland, part of Bütschwil municipality.
- Dietfurt, a former German name for Żnin, a town in Kuyavian-Pomeranian Voivodeship, Poland
