= Alpina B3 =

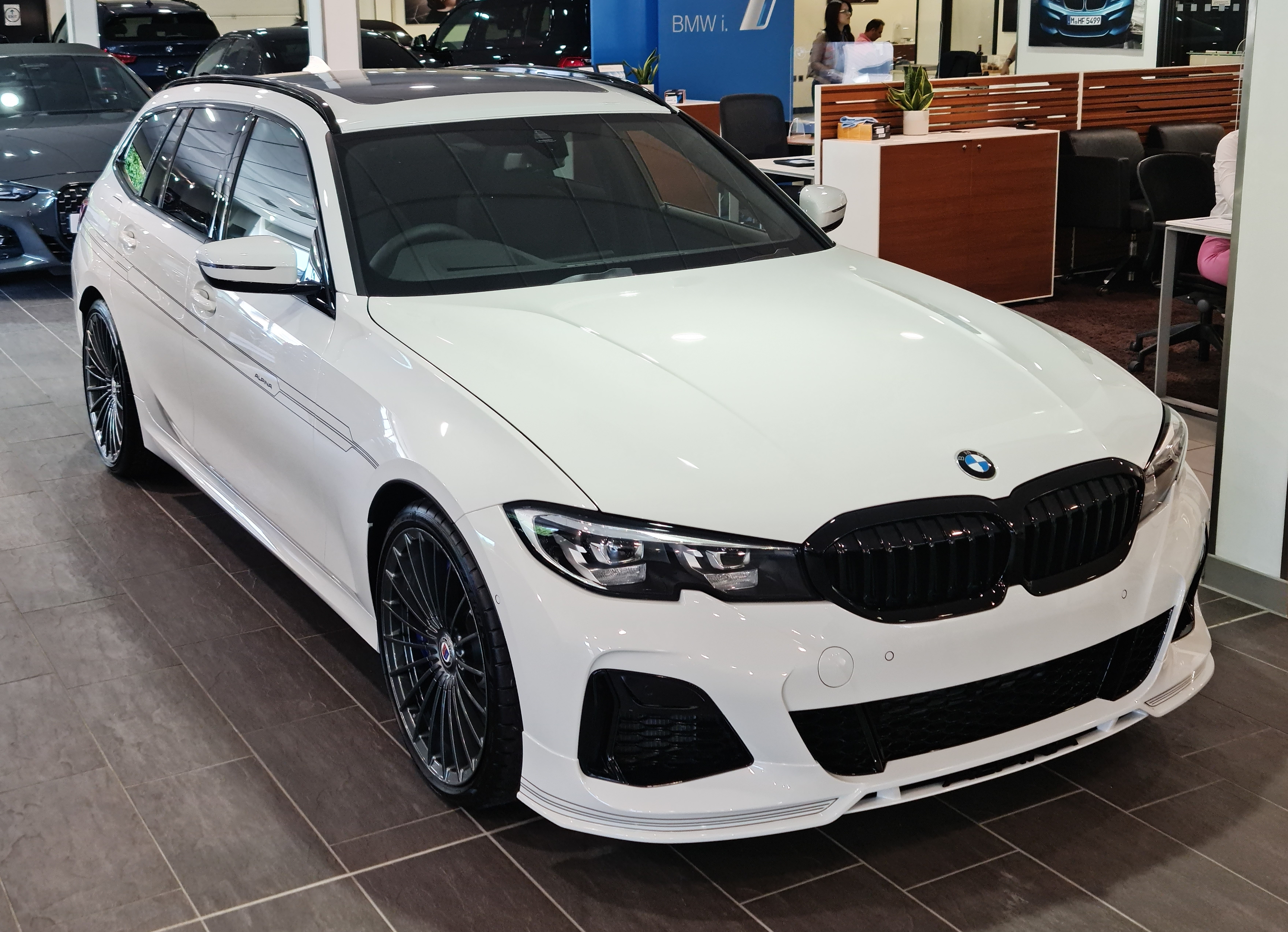

Overview
- Manufacturer: Alpina
- Production: 1987-2025

Body and chassis
- Class: Compact executive car (D)
- Related: BMW M3; BMW 3 Series

The Alpina B3 are a series of high performance executive cars manufactured by German automobile manufacturer Alpina, which is based on the BMW 3 Series of the car manufacturer BMW. As of 2021, it is produced as a sedan (four-door) and station wagon (touring). Up to and including the E90 series, two-door sedans, coupes and convertibles were also offered. With the exception of the convertible, every model was optionally available with all-wheel drive. The current diesel variant runs under the Alpina D3 Biturbo.

== First generation (E30; 1987-1992) ==
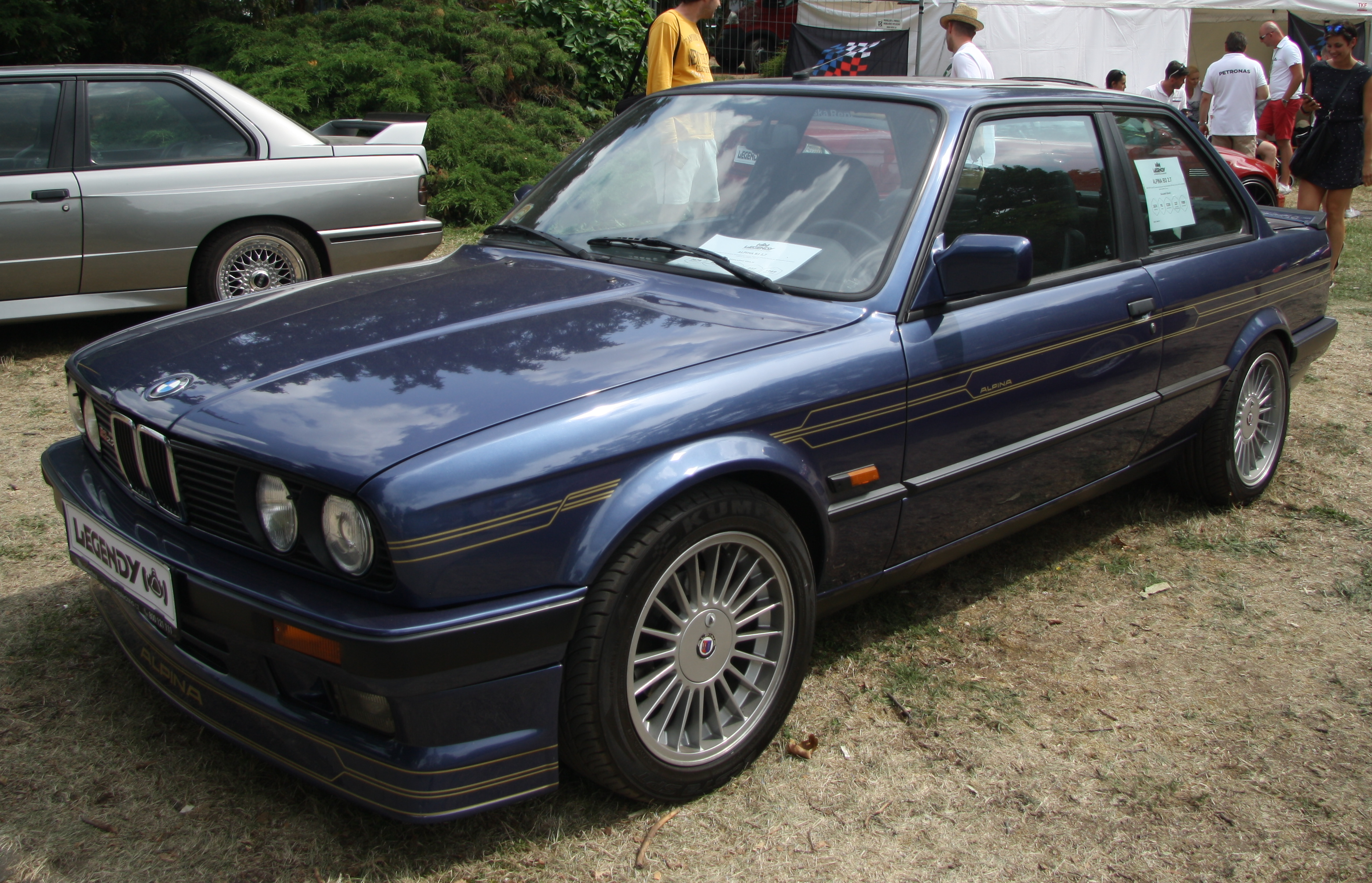
Alpina B3 (E30)

The Alpina B3 2.7 was produced from August 1987 to May 1992. A total of 257 units were manufactured in Buchloe, the number of units includes all variants. The basis for this was the BMW E30 325i (BMW E30) with the M20 engine. It had an in-line six-cylinder with a displacement of 2693 cm^{3} and had an output of 150 kW (204 hp) and a torque of 265 Nm. The machine had a larger displacement than the series, machined combustion chambers, a 268° camshaft (later 272°) and special cast pistons. Furthermore, a manifold made of VA steel and two metal catalytic converters were attached. The stated performance was achieved through these measures. The B3 accelerated from 0 to 100 km/h in 7.1 seconds and reached a top speed of 227 (224) km/h. The M20-C2/2 engine is the smallest engine variant that Alpina made during the Noelle era. Karl-Otto Noelle was an engine developer at Alpina from 1984 to 1993.

In addition, there was a version of the BMW E30 M3 with the designation B6 3.5 S and the 3.43-liter six-cylinder, which was significantly revised (Alpina engine type B10 / 5, 3430 cc, 187 kW / 254 PS, 320 Nm).

== Second generation (E36; 1993-1999) ==
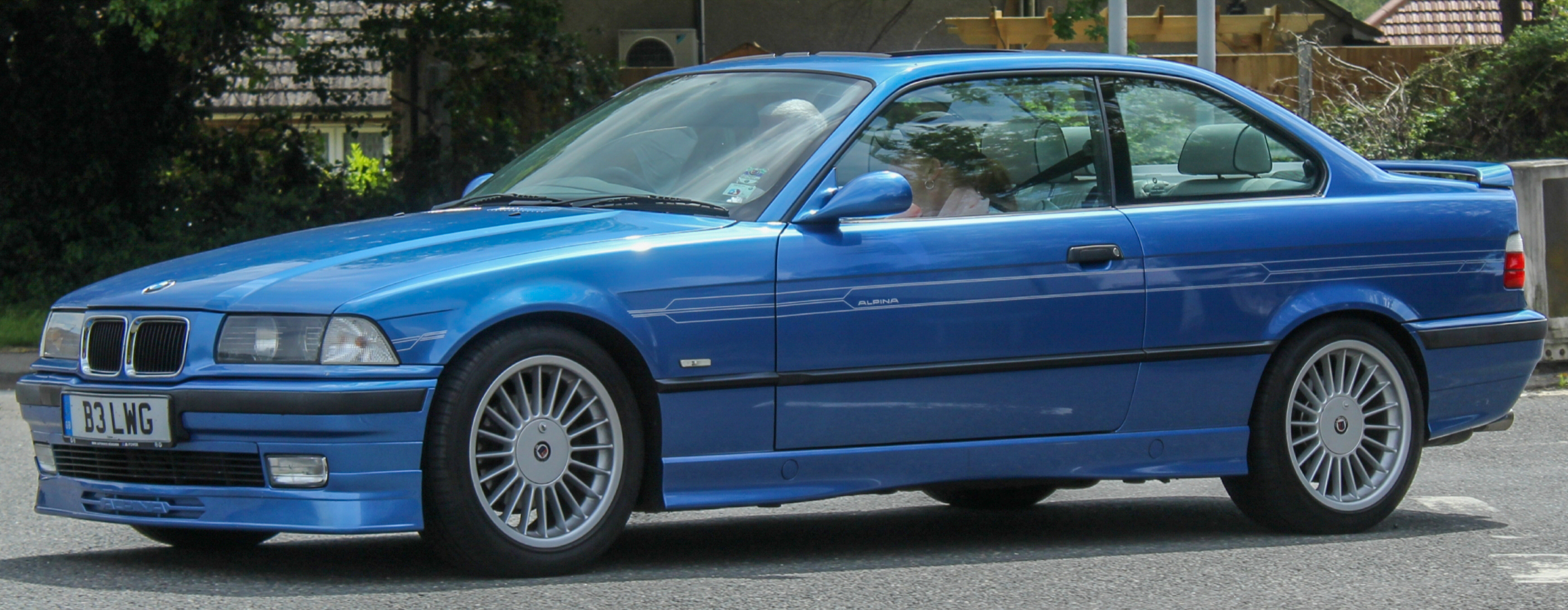
Alpina B3 3.2 (E36)

Between 1993 and 1996, the BMW Alpina B3 3.0 of the E36 series was produced. It was the direct successor model of the Alpina B6-2.8 model of the E36 series, which was also based on the BMW 325i (but M50B25 without Vanos model until the BMW factory holidays in August 1992 - then with VANOS). In the spring of 1996, the B3 3.2 followed as an upgrade. The body base for the B3 3.0 was a 325i (BMW E36) and a 328i for the B3 3.2. In both models, however, Alpina used the more robust M50 (B25TÜ) cast iron engine, as the M52 engine of the 328i was not suitable for expanding the displacement. Both vehicle variants were available as a coupé (two-door) and sedan (four-door), cabriolet (convertible) and station wagon (touring).

== Third generation (E46; 1999-2006) ==
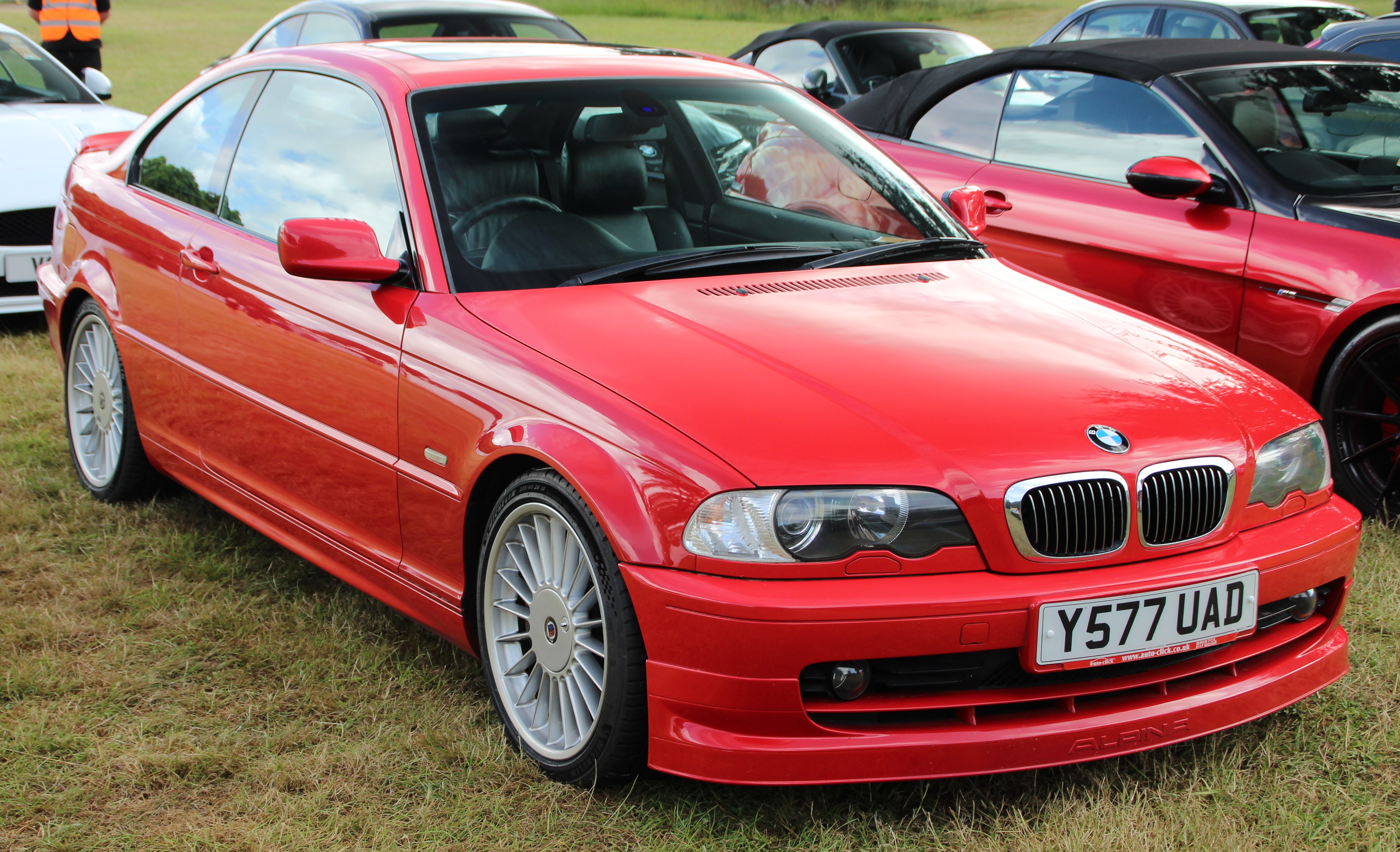
Alpina B3 (E46)

In 1999, the new BMW Alpina B3 3.3 of the E46 series was introduced. The year before, a prototype with the 3.2-liter engine of the B3 3.2 had been presented at the Birmingham Auto Show. The production model was formally presented at the 1999 Geneva Motor Show and the station wagon at the 2000 Birmingham Auto Show. The body base was initially provided by the 328i (M52TÜ) and then later by the 330i (M54). The following model variants were available: sedan, coupé, cabriolet (convertible) and station wagon (touring). From 2001, the B3 was also offered in an all-wheel drive variant, the premiere of which took place at the Geneva Motor Show of the same year. From 2002, the Alpina B3 S with 224 kW maximum power and 362 Nm maximum torque was produced. Its premiere took place at the Paris Motor Show in 2002. For both E46-B3 models, Alpina used the E36-US-M3 gray cast iron engine block (S52B32/US) as the basis and modified it, since neither the M52TÜ nor the M54 engine block were suitable for it.

== Fourth generation (E9x; 2007-2012) ==
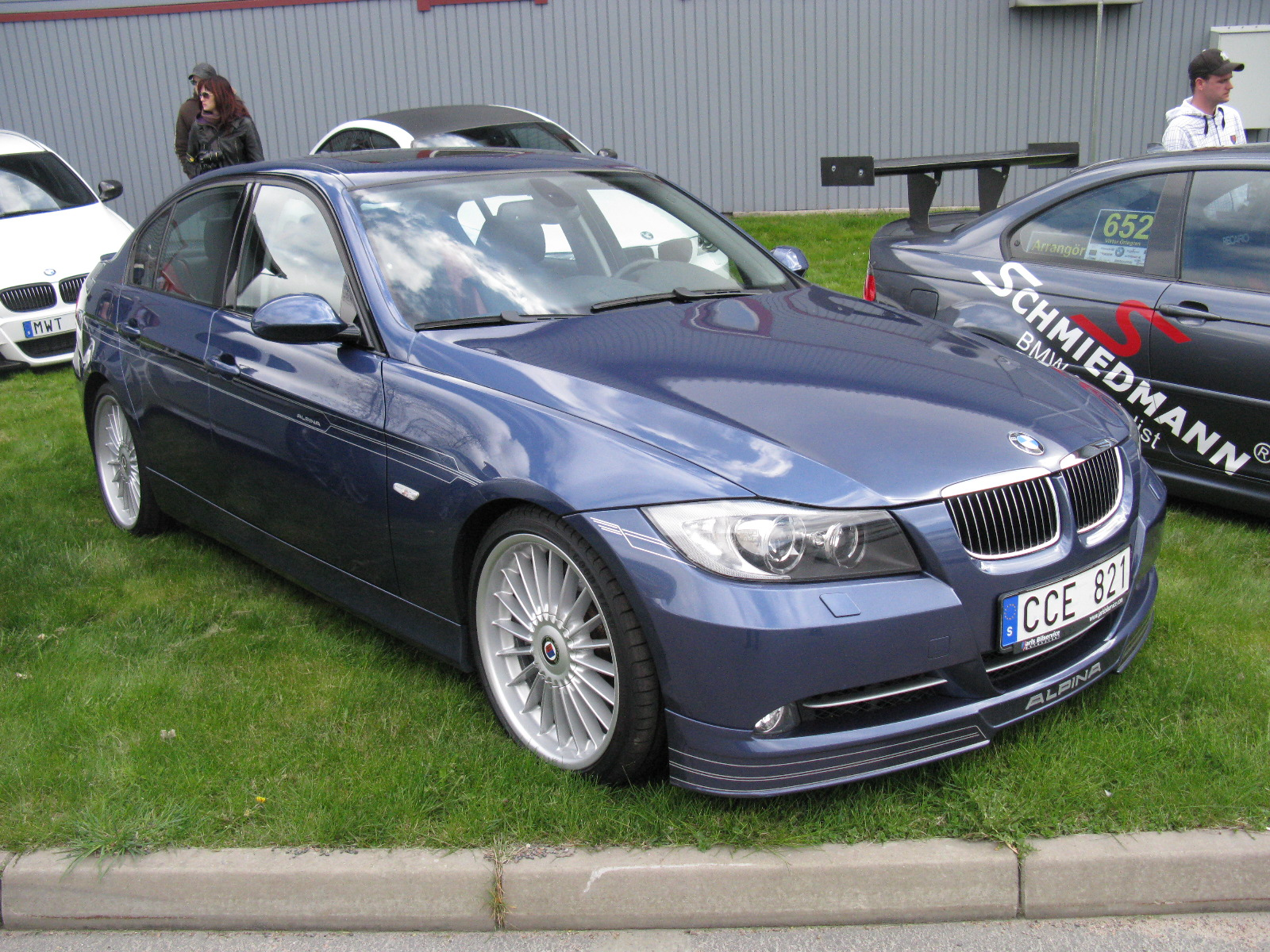
Alpina B3 (E90)

The second Alpina B3 Biturbo was produced from 2007 to 2012. The formal premiere took place at the 2007 Geneva Motor Show, with the coupé debuting the following summer at the Goodwood Festival of Speed, and the convertible debuting at the IAA 2007. The station wagon was only available with the facelift in October 2008. It is based on the BMW E9x 335i, and is powered by a twin-turbocharged 3.0 L six-cylinder engine which produces a maximum output of 265 kW (355 hp) and 500 N⋅m (369 lb⋅ft). This allows it to accelerate from 0 to 100 km/h (62 mph) in 4.8 seconds, and on to a claimed top speed of 285 km/h (177 mph). The B3 Biturbo was available as a sedan (E90), station wagon (Touring, E91), cabriolet (convertible, E93) and coupé (E92), from 2008 also optionally with all-wheel drive (except convertible). Alpina modified the exterior with front and rear spoilers and a double-flow, double-sided exhaust system (a total of four tailpipes). For the 2010 model year, the B3S Biturbo was presented at the 2010 Geneva Motor Show. The maximum power increased by 29 kW (39 hp) to 294 kW (394 hp) and the torque increased to 540 N⋅m (398 lb⋅ft). The B3S accelerates from 0 to 100 km/h (62 mph) in 4.7 seconds. The maximum speed is 300 km/h (186 mph) according to the factory. Production of the E90 and E91 (saloon and estate) ended in 2011, while E92/E93 (coupé/convertible) production continued until 2013.

== Fifth generation (F30; 2013-2019) ==
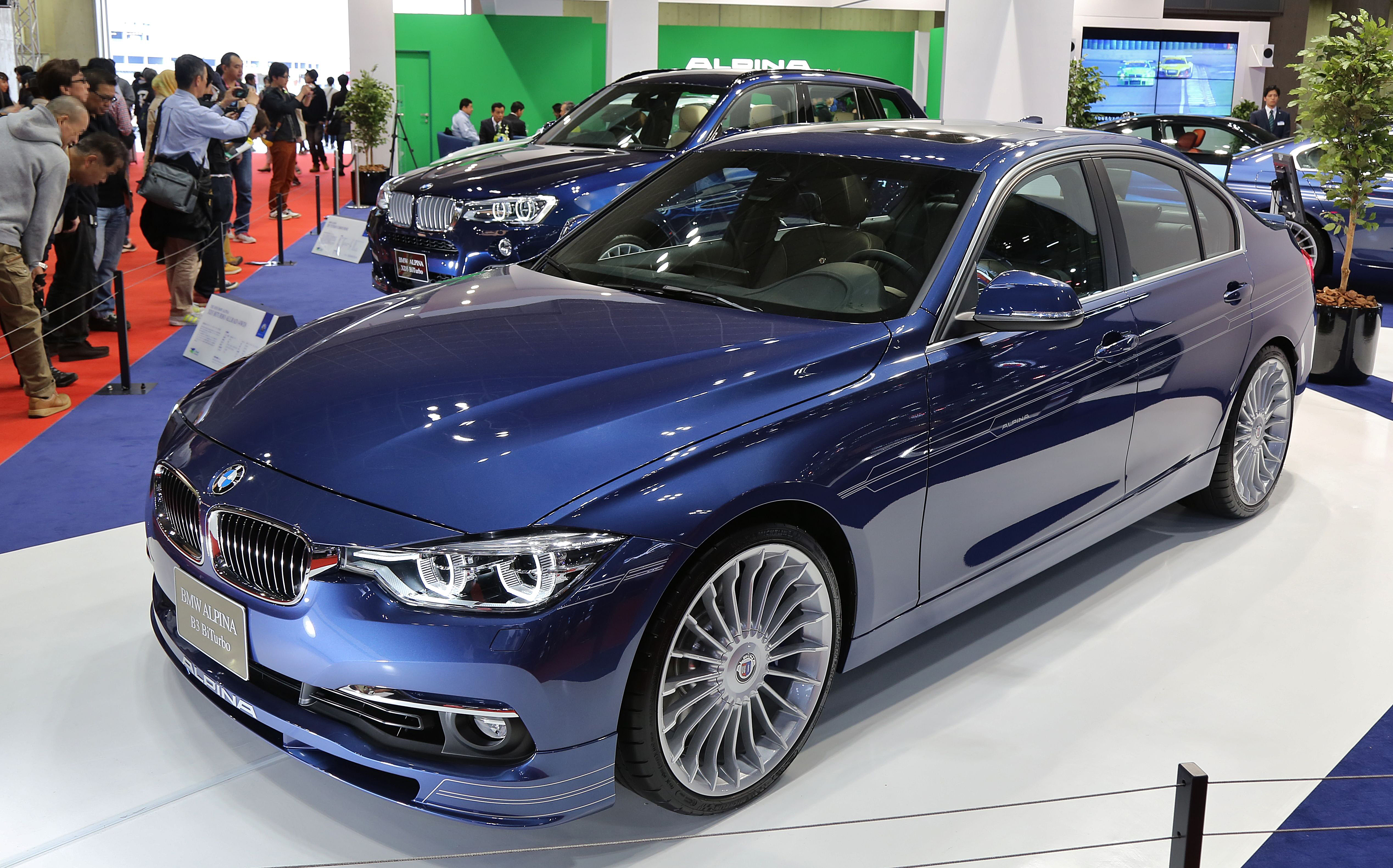
Alpina B3 Biturbo (F30)

The formal premiere of the sedan F30 and the station wagon F31 at the 2013 Geneva Motor Show took place in the third Alpina B3 Biturbo. It was produced between March 2013 and May 2019. It was based on the BMW F30/F31 335i until 2017, has an in-line six-cylinder engine with 3.0 L displacement and bi-turbocharging. The engine with a maximum output of 301 kW (410 hp) with a maximum torque of 600 Nm accelerates the B3 from 0 to 100 km/h in 4.0 seconds. According to the factory, the maximum speed is 305 km/h. The B3 Biturbo are available as a sedan or station wagon (touring), both of which could be combined with all-wheel drive (xDrive).

Alpina modified the exterior with front and rear spoilers and a four-pipe exhaust system. The facelift of the F30/F31 was also incorporated into the design of the Alpina B3 Biturbo in 2015. In March 2017, Alpina revised the drive of the B3 and took the BMW F30/F31 340i as the basis. From now on, this has a maximum output of 324 kW (440 hp). Production ended in autumn 2018 for the sedan and in summer 2019 for the station wagon.

== Sixth generation (G20; 2020-2025) ==
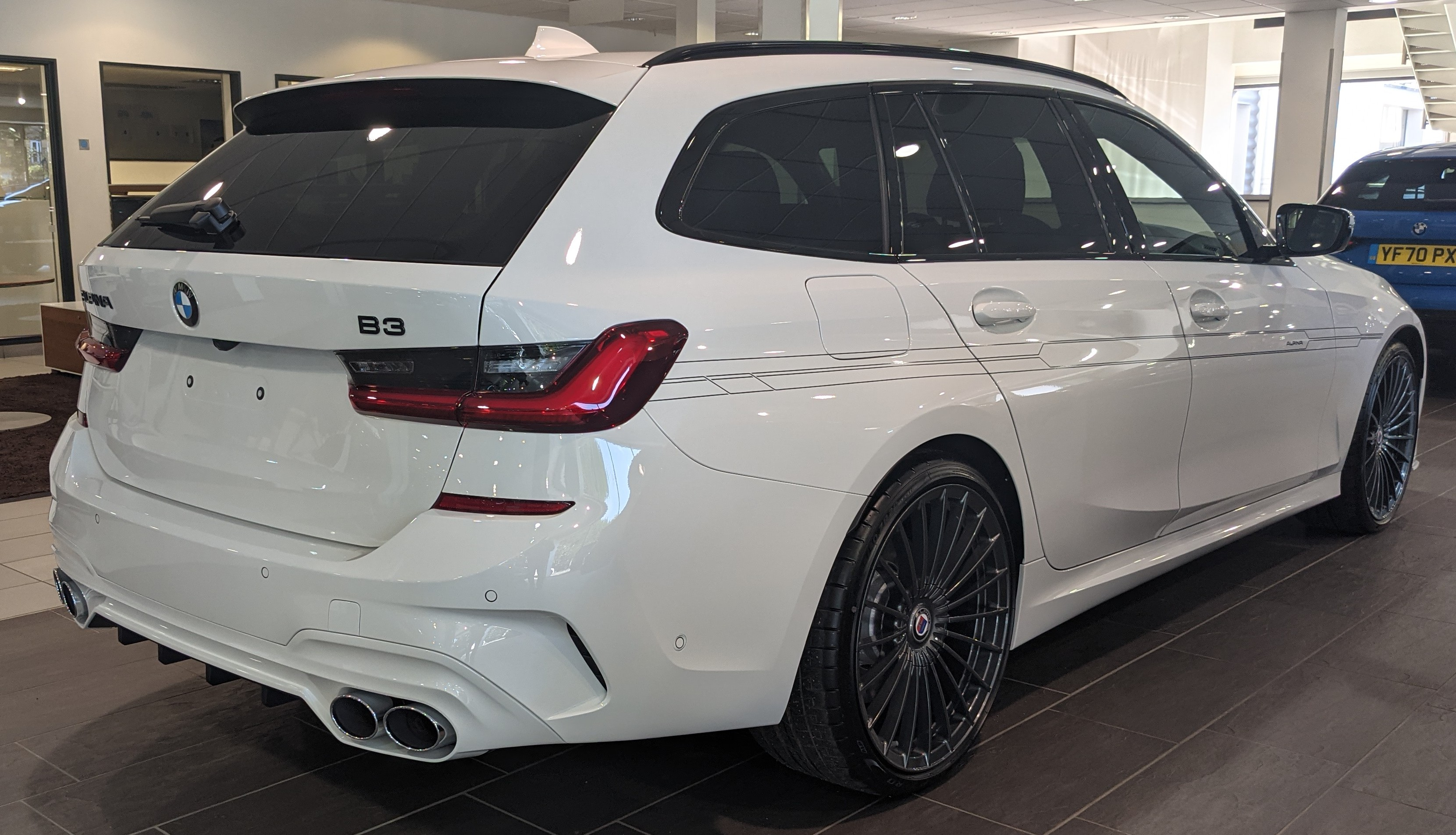
Alpina B3 Touring (G21) rear

Main article: BMW 3 Series (G20)§Alpina B3 and D3

The Alpina B3 based on the BMW G21 station wagon (Touring) was presented at the 68th International Motor Show Germany (IAA) in September 2019 in Frankfurt. The car is powered by the same S58 straight-six petrol engine as the G80/81 M3, but tuned to produce 344 kW (468 PS; 461 hp) and 700 N⋅m (516 lb⋅ft).

At the Tokyo Motor Show in October 2019, Alpina presented the B3, based on the BMW G20 sedan.

With the G20 BMW 3 Series facelift debuting in 2022, Alpina's take on the B3 was also revealed. Available in either B3 sedan or D3 S Touring models, both get the Alpina styling cues along with a substantial power bump over its donor cars.
