= Gennach =

River in Germany

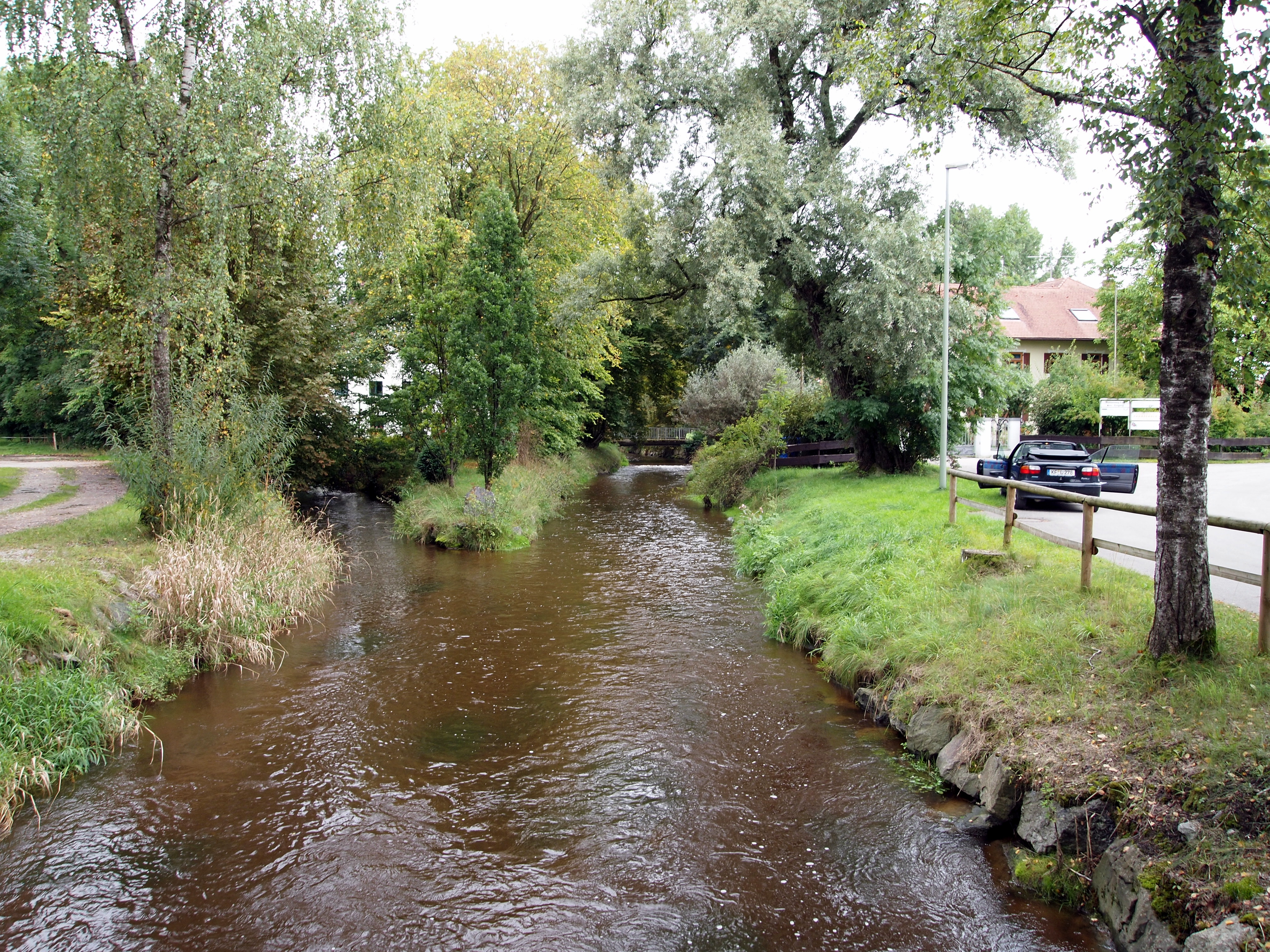
- The Gernach in Jengen, at the confluence of the Wiesmühlbach

Location
- Country: Germany
- State: Bavaria

Physical characteristics
- Mouth
  - location: Wertach
  - coordinates: 48.1720°N 10.7304°E
- Length: 49.1 km (30.5 mi)
- Basin size: 257 km^{2} (99 sq mi)

Basin features
- Progression: Wertach→ Lech→ Danube→ Black Sea

The Gennach is a river in Bavaria, Germany. It flows into the Wertach near Schwabmünchen.

== See also ==
- List of rivers of Bavaria
