= Manuel Strodel =

German ice hockey player (born 1992)

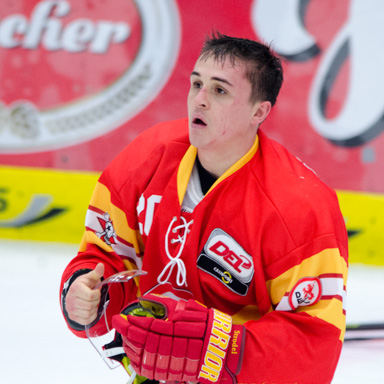
- Strodel playing for the DEG
- Born: January 17, 1992 (age 33); Buchloe, Germany
- Height: 1.75 m (5 ft 9 in)
- Weight: 76 kg (168 lb; 12 st 0 lb)
- Position: Forward
- Shoots: Left
- DEL2 team Former teams: Starbulls Rosenheim; Düsseldorfer EG; Füchse Duisburg; EC Bad Neuheim; Löwen Frankfurt
- NHL draft: Undrafted
- Playing career: 2011–present

Manuel Strodel (born January 17, 1992, in Buchloe) is a German professional ice hockey player currently playing for Starbulls Rosenheim of the DEL2 in Germany. He previously played for Düsseldorfer EG in the Deutsche Eishockey Liga (DEL).

Strodel played the entirety of his career until the conclusion of the 2018–19 season, with Düsseldorfer EG. After 8 seasons with the club, Strodel was not offered a new contract with Düsseldorfer on April 6, 2019.
