= Thomas Holzmann =

German ice hockey player (born 1987)

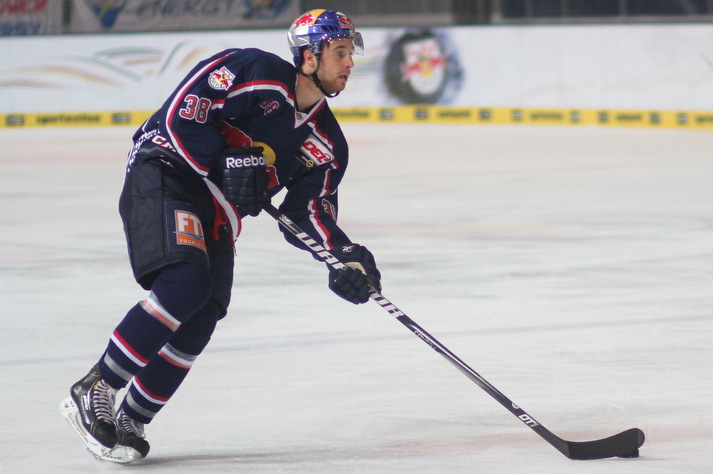
- Born: July 17, 1987 (age 37); Buchloe, Germany
- Height: 6 ft 2 in (188 cm)
- Weight: 176 lb (80 kg; 12 st 8 lb)
- Position: Forward
- Shoots: Left
- DEL2 team Former teams: EV Landshut; Hannover Scorpions; Kassel Huskies; Hamburg Freezers; Iserlohn Roosters; EHC München; Augsburger Panther
- Playing career: 2005–present

Thomas Holzmann (born July 17, 1987) is a German professional ice hockey forward who currently plays for EV Landshut of the DEL2.

== Playing career ==
Holzmann began his career as a junior in the ESV Kaufbueren organization. He made his DEL debut with the Hannover Scorpions before joining and breaking out with 26 points in 50 games with the Kassel Huskies in the 2009–10 season. Following the dissolution of the Huskies, Holzmann then signed a two-year contract with the Hamburg Freezers on May 22, 2010.

Unable to repeat his successful season in 2010–11, posting 4 points in 48 games, Holzmann was released from the second year of his contract with the Freezers to join the Iserlohn Roosters on a new two-year deal on June 21, 2011.

After two seasons with the Roosters, Holzmann left to sign a contract with EHC München on May 31, 2013. Following his second season with Red Bull in 2014–15 season, Holzmann was not tendered a new contract by Munich to sign as a free agent to a one-year deal with Augsburger Panther on April 3, 2015.

== Career statistics ==
			Regular season					Playoffs
Season	Team	League	GP	G	A	Pts	PIM	GP	G	A	Pts	PIM
2005–06	ESV Kaufbeuren	2.GBun	49	8	7	15	0	10	3	4	7	2
2006–07	ESV Kaufbeuren	2.GBun	48	20	14	34	20	7	0	3	3	26
2007–08	Hannover Scorpions	DEL	4	0	0	0	0	—	—	—	—	—
2007–08	Fischtown Pinguins	2.GBun	51	18	12	30	60	7	1	1	2	12
2008–09	Hannover Scorpions	DEL	12	1	0	1	33	—	—	—	—	—
2008–09	Fischtown Pinguins	2.GBun	34	13	13	26	64	6	0	2	2	22
2009–10	Kassel Huskies	DEL	50	9	17	26	72	—	—	—	—	—
2010–11	Hamburg Freezers	DEL	48	1	3	4	43	—	—	—	—	—
2010–11	ETC Crimmitschau	2.GBun	5	5	0	5	2	—	—	—	—	—
2011–12	Iserlohn Roosters	DEL	18	1	1	2	8	2	0	0	0	2
2012–13	Iserlohn Roosters	DEL	48	4	6	10	59	—	—	—	—	—
2013–14	EHC München	DEL	37	7	7	14	14	2	0	0	0	2
2014–15	EHC München	DEL	50	2	8	10	20	2	0	0	0	0
2015–16	Augsburger Panther	DEL	49	13	13	26	51	—	—	—	—	—
2016–17	Augsburger Panther	DEL	52	10	7	17	47	7	1	5	6	4
2017–18	Augsburger Panther	DEL	49	12	9	21	16	—	—	—	—	—
2018–19	Augsburger Panther	DEL	47	3	11	14	59	13	1	1	2	6
2019–20	Augsburger Panther	DEL	44	4	4	8	14	—	—	—	—	—
2020–21	Augsburger Panther	DEL	21	3	4	7	14	—	—	—	—	—
DEL totals			529	70	90	160	450	26	2	6	8	14
