= Treuchtlingen =

- Town
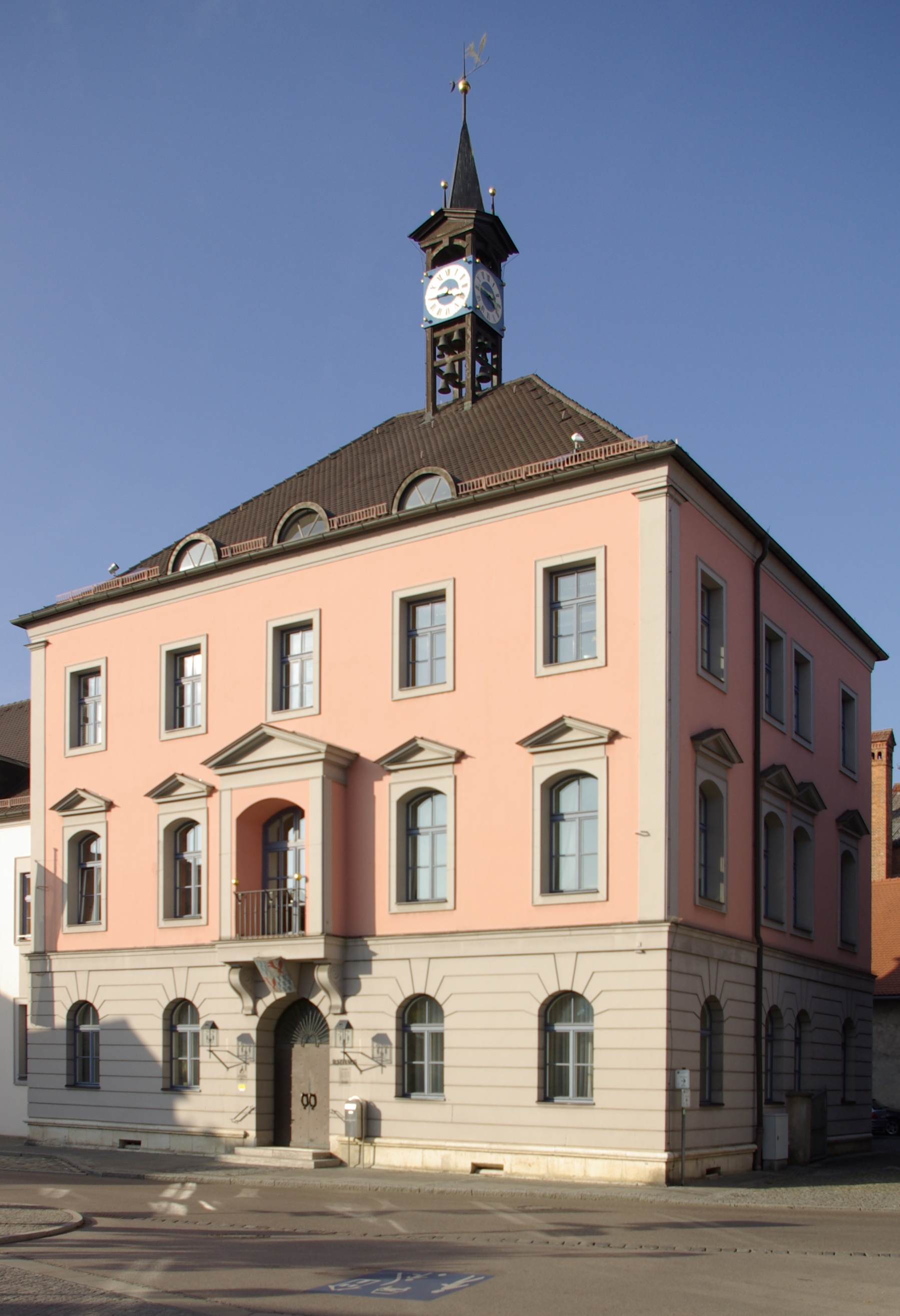
- Town Hall

- Coat of arms

- Location of Treuchtlingen within Weißenburg-Gunzenhausen district
- Interactive map of Treuchtlingen
- Location within Germany Location within Bavaria
- Coordinates: 48°57′19″N 10°54′34″E
- Country: Germany
- State: Bavaria
- Admin. region: Mittelfranken
- District: Weißenburg-Gunzenhausen

Government
  - Mayor (2020–26): Kristina Becker (CSU)

Area
  - Total: 103.38 km^{2} (39.92 sq mi)
- Elevation: 412 m (1,352 ft)

Population (2025-12-31)
  - Total: 13,110
  - Density: 126.8/km^{2} (328.4/sq mi)
- Time zone: UTC+01:00 (CET)
  - Summer (DST): UTC+02:00 (CEST)
- Postal codes: 91757
- Dialling codes: 09142
- Vehicle registration: WUG
- Website: Official website

Treuchtlingen (German pronunciation: [ˈtʁɔʏçtlɪŋən]) is a town in the Weißenburg-Gunzenhausen district, in Bavaria, Germany. It has a population of around 12,000.

== History ==
The spot where the town is situated was first settled by Celts, Romans and Franks. The town proper was founded in 793, during the reign of Charlemagne, and it was first mentioned in 899, as Drutelinga. In the 12th century the castle was erected. In 1495 Treuchtlingen was burnt down. In 1869 the train station was opened.

On 23 February 1945 at 11:00 clock an air raid on the station Treuchtlingen (Operation Clarion) took place, in which the Fronturlauberzug SF 2046 just stopped. The passengers of the train fled into the platform underpass, which received a direct hit.300 people died in the platform underpass, a total of nearly 600 people were killed and another 900 injured in the station and the surrounding area. Most of the bomb victims are buried in the memorial site of Kriegsgräberfürsorge on the Nagelberg. In the underpass, which tunneled the tracks elsewhere since a station renovation in 2004, a marble plaque commemorates the victims. In a second attack on April 11, 1945, no people were killed, but among other things, a steam locomotive type Bayerische G 3/4 H destroyed. Part of the wreck was found in the course of the reconstruction and is now in the Bavarian Railway Museum in Nördlingen.

== Geography ==
=== Location ===
Treuchtlingen is situated on the river Altmühl, 9 km southwest of Weißenburg in Bayern, and 45 km northeast of Donauwörth.

Since it is located on the European Watershed between Rhine and Danube, the municipal territory is the site of the remains of Fossa Carolina, an early Medieval attempt to bridge the watershed.

=== Subdivisions ===
In addition to the town itself, the municipality of Treuchtlingen today includes 53 hamlets and villages. The municipal territory is divided into 12 Ortsteile (including the town) and several hamlets:

Arms	Ortsteil	Localities included
	Treuchtlingen	Eulenhof, Gstadt, Heunischhof, Kästleinsmühle, Metzenhof, Möhrenberg, Sägmühle, Schertnershof, Schmarrmühle, Siebeneichhöfe, Ziegelhütte
	Auernheim	Freihardt, Hagenhof, Schlittenhart, Wieshof
	Bubenheim	none
	Dietfurt	Bergnershof
	Graben	none
	Grönhart	Hagenau, Naßwiesen, Neuheim
	Gundelsheim	none
	Haag	Dickmühle, Hürth, Mattenmühle, Neufang, Rutzenhof, Schürmühle, Steinbruch
	Möhren	Eichhof, Fuchsmühle, Spielhof
	Schambach	Bonhof, Kohlmühle, Lehnleinsmühle, Obere Papiermühle, Untere Papiermühle, Weinbergshof
	Wettelsheim	Dornmühle, Falbenthal, Kellerhaus, Ziegelmühle, Zollmühle
	Windischhausen	Oberheumödern, Unterheumödern

== Government ==
=== Mayors ===
- Friedrich Grahl, 1894–1907
- Jacob Aurnhammer, 1888-1894 and 1907–1909
- Ludwig Staudinger, 1909–1912
- Karl Kraft, 1912–1918
- Emil Otto Sommer, 1918–1933
- Andreas Güntner, 1933–1945
- Friedrich Korn, 1946–1956
- Hans Döbler, 1956–1984
- Wolfgang Herrmann (CSU), 1984–2008
- Werner Baum jun. (SPD), 2008–2020
- Kristina Becker (CSU), since 1 May 2020

== Transport ==
Treuchtlingen is the initial point of the Treuchtlingen-Würzburg railway.

== Twin towns – sister cities ==
Treuchtlingen is twinned with:

- Bonyhád, Hungary
- Ponsacco, Italy

== Photogallery ==
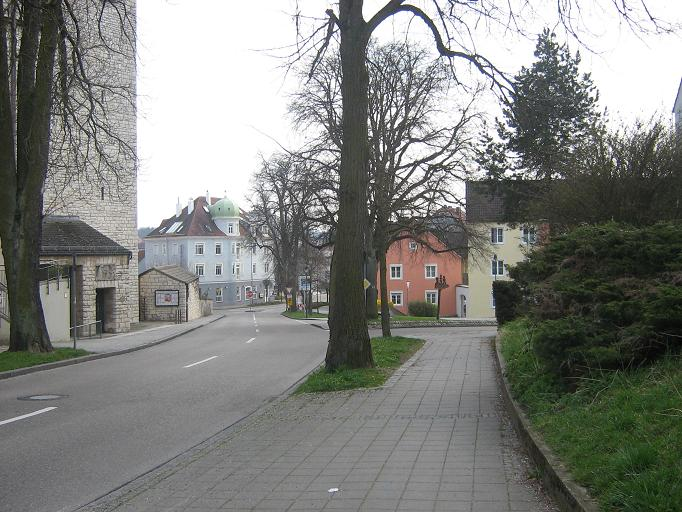
Town centre at Ringstraße

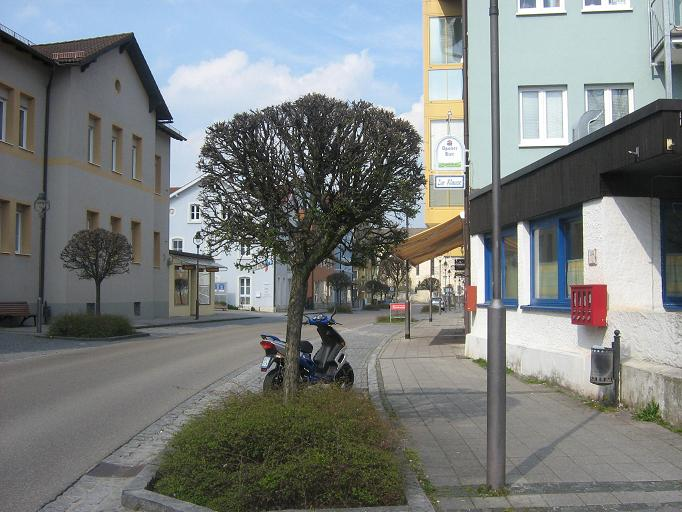
Town centre at Luitpoldstraße

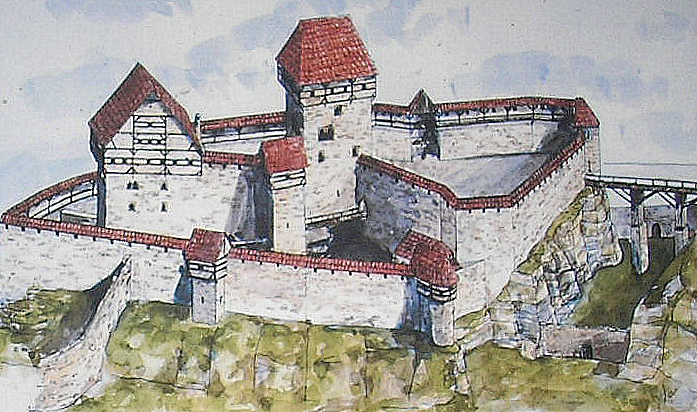
The old castle of Treuchtlingen (around 1420)

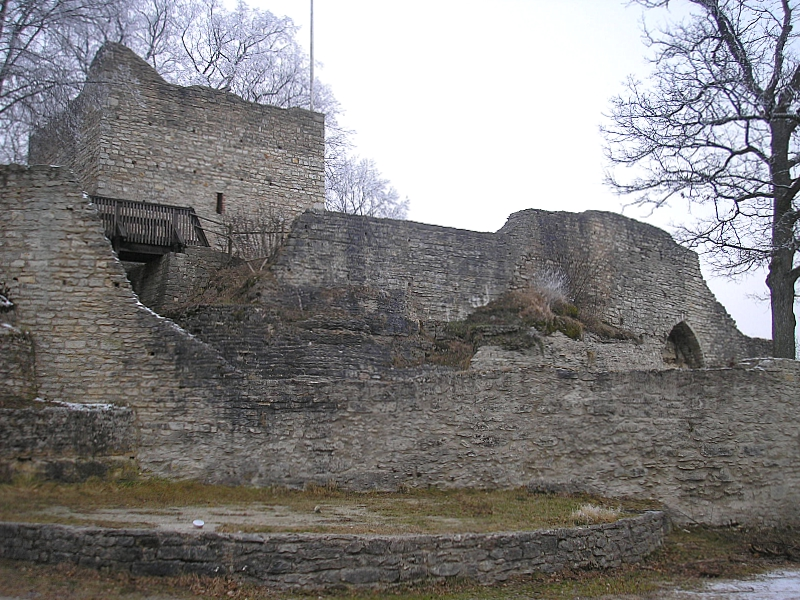
Old castle of Treuchtlingen (Obere Veste)

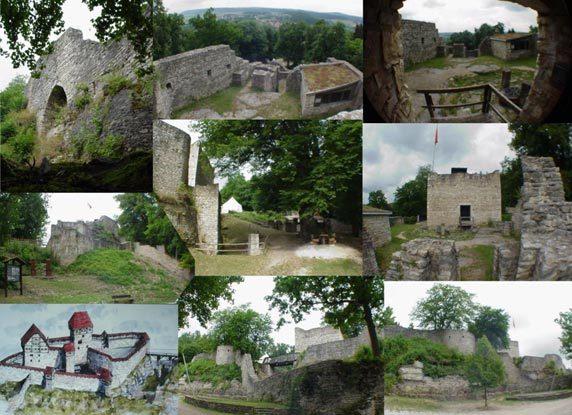
Ruins of the old castle

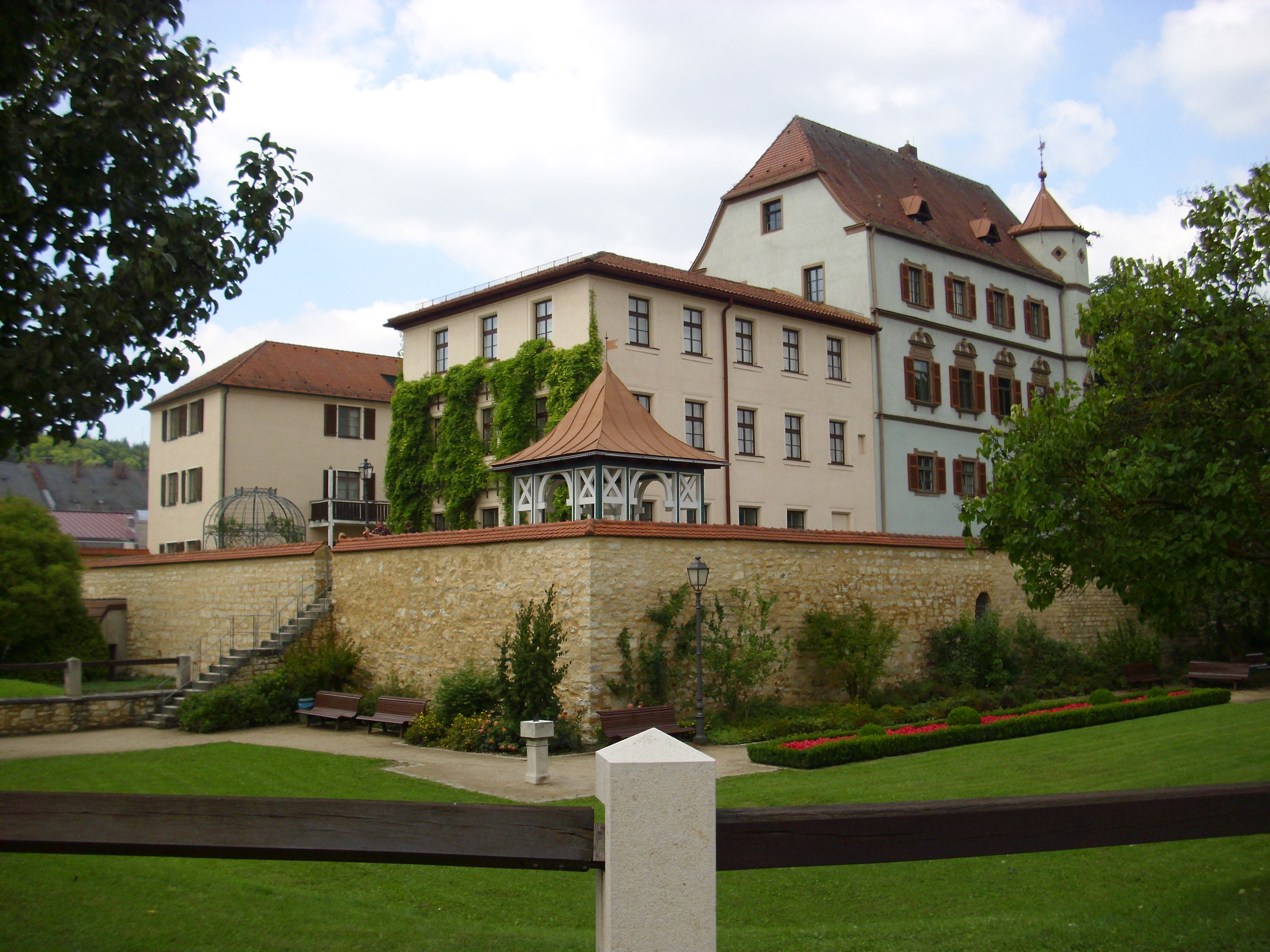
The new castle

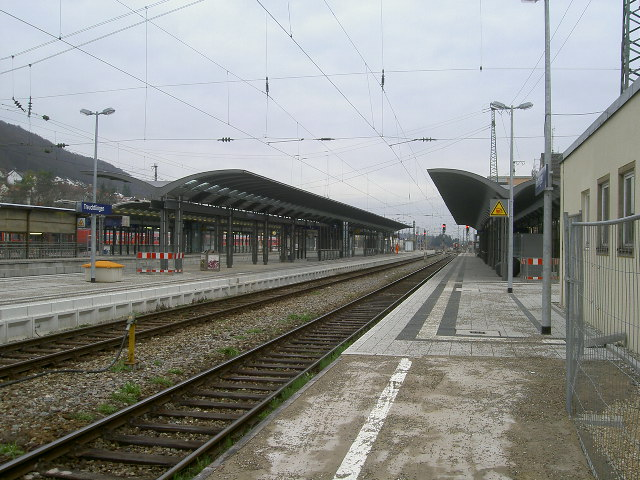
Train station

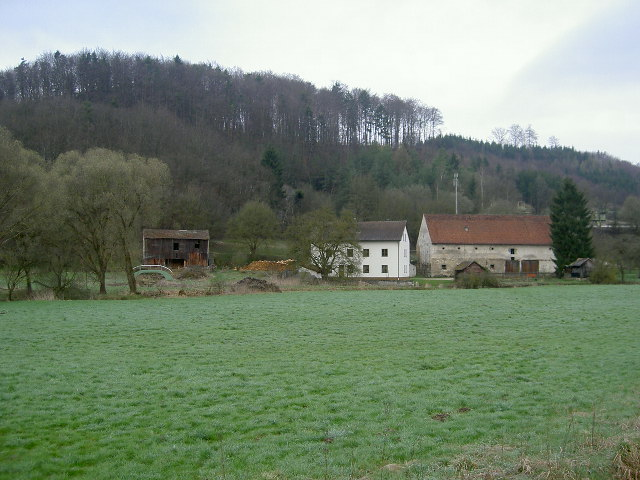
Old watermill in western suburb

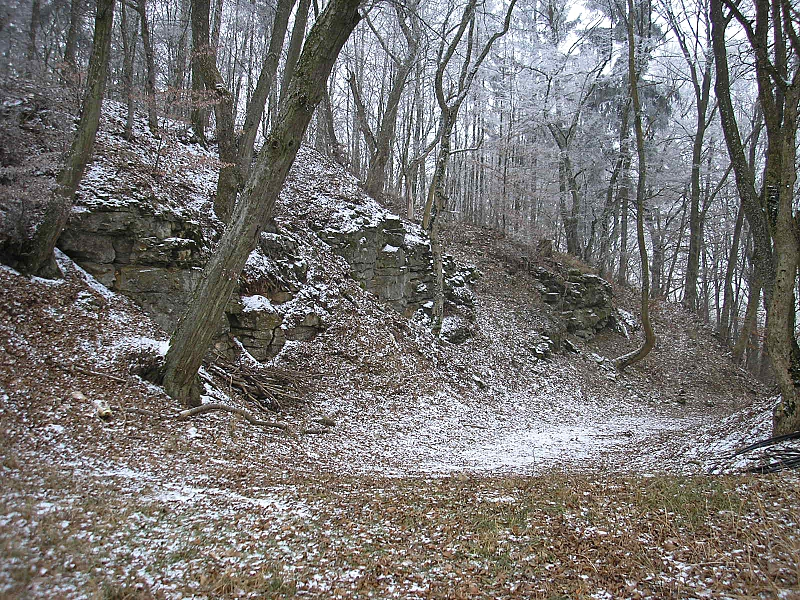
Wood near Obere Veste

== Notable people ==
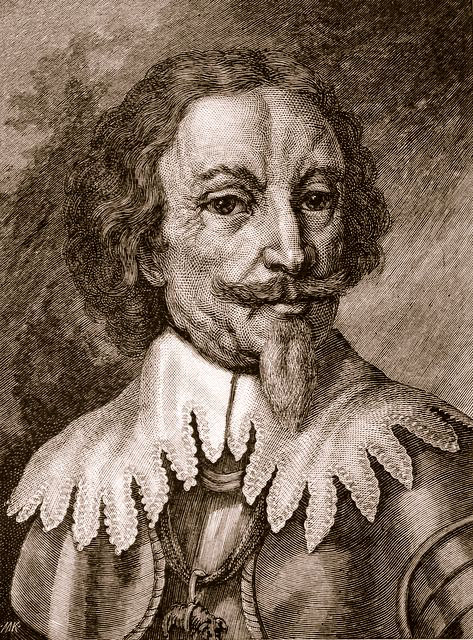
Gottfried Heinrich von Pappenheim

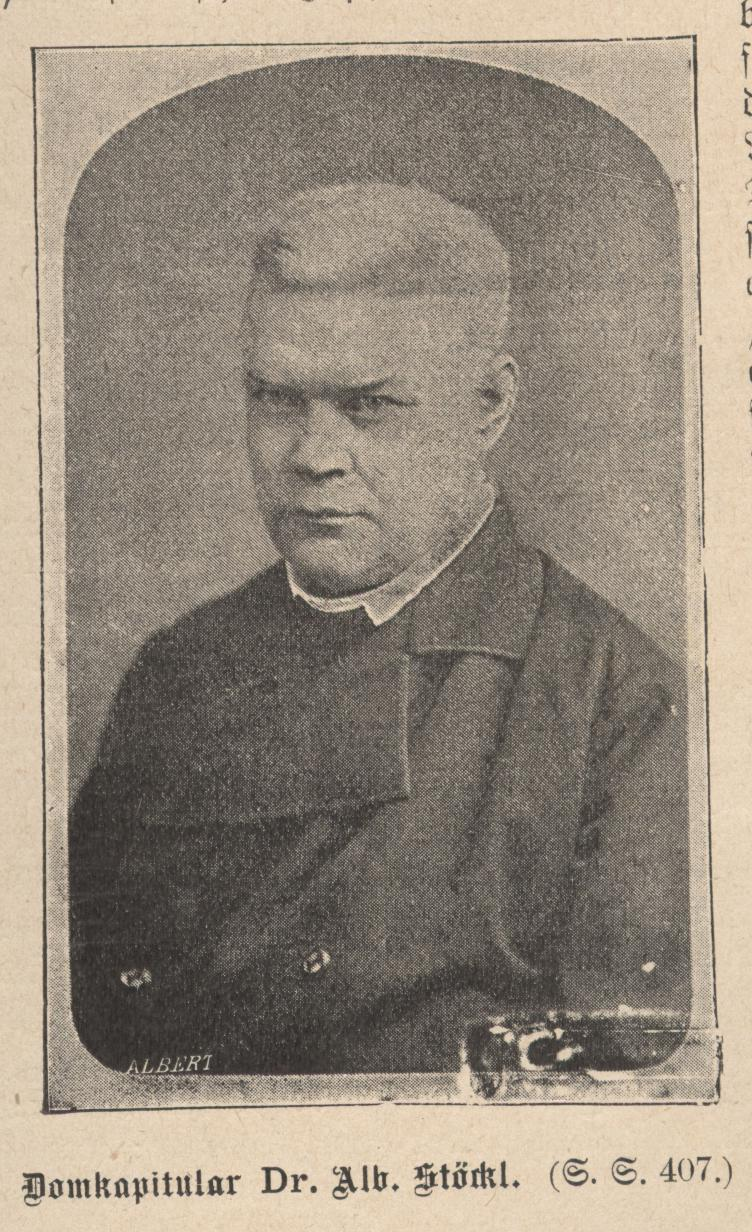
Albert Stöckl 1896

- Gottfried Heinrich Graf zu Pappenheim (1594–1632), field marshal of the Holy Roman Emperor, during the Thirty Years' War commander of a cavalry regiment in the service of the League and the Habsburg Emperor.
- Albert Stöckl (1823–1895), priest and theologian, professor and Reichstag deputy for the Centre Party (Germany)
- Elkan Naumburg (1835–1924), German-American banker, philanthropist and musicologist
- Ludwig Fels (born 1946), writer
- Joachim Grzega (born 1971), linguist
- Sebastian Glasner (born 1985), soccer player

== Bibliography ==
- Daniel Burger/Birgit Friedel: Burgen und Schlösser in Mittelfranken; ars vivendi verlag: Cadolzburg 2003; S. 125–128; ISBN 3-89716-379-9.
- Werner Somplatzki: Kirchen in Altmühlfranken; (Reihe Gelbe Taschenbuch-Führer); wek-Verlag: Treuchtlingen 1990; ISBN 978-3-924828-34-9; hier: S. 70-73 u. 76–85.
- Walter E. Keller: Treuchtlingen; (Reihe Gelbe Taschenbuch-Führer); wek-Verlag: Treuchtlingen/Berlin 2006; ISBN 978-3-934145-31-3.
- Walter E. Keller (Hrsg.): Das Dorf Schambach; wek-Verlag: Treuchtlingen 2002; ISBN 978-3-934145-15-3.
- Gotthard Kießling: Landkreis Weißenburg-Gunzenhausen. (Denkmäler in Bayern, V 70/1); Munich 2000; ISBN 3-87490-581-0.
