= Albert Stöckl =

German philosopher and theologian (1823–1895)

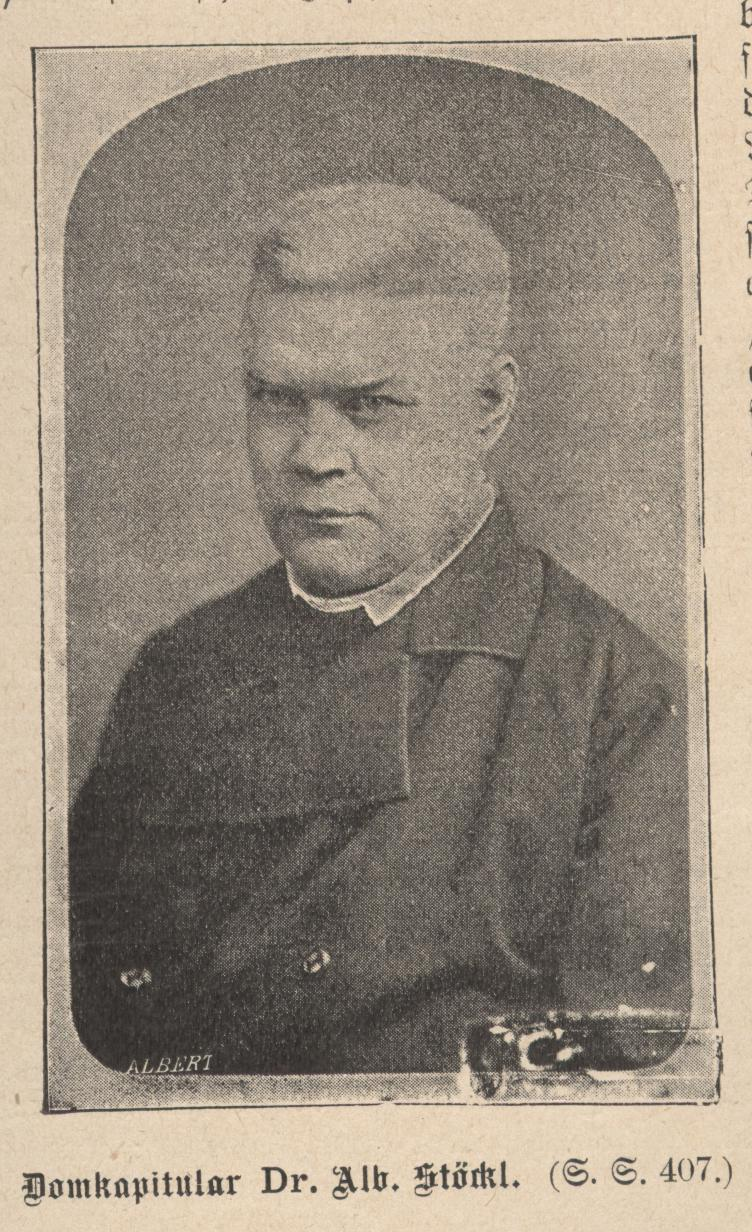
Cathedral Canon Dr. Albert Stöckl, Eichstädt, 1896

Albert Stöckl (15 March 1823 in Möhren, Middle Franconia, Kingdom of Bavaria – 15 November 1895 in Eichstädt) was a German neo-scholastic philosopher and theologian.

== Biography ==
He received his classical education at the gymnasium at Eichstädt, studied philosophy and theology at the episcopal lyceum in the same city (1843–48), and was ordained priest 22 April 1848. His first position was that of curate at the pilgrimage church at Wemding.

In 1850, he was made instructor of philosophy at the episcopal lyceum at Eichstädt, and two years later was appointed professor of theoretical philosophy in the same institution. He received the degree of Doctor of Philosophy (1855) from the University of Würzburg; and was transferred (1857) to the theological section of the lyceum as professor of exegesis and Hebrew.

In the autumn of 1862 he accepted a call as professor of philosophy at the academy of Münster in Westphalia. The disagreeable divisions and discord which arose in this institution at the time of the First Vatican Council led Stöckl, in the summer of 1871, to resign his professorship and return to the Diocese of Eichstädt as parish priest at Gimpertshausen.

On 7 March 1872, he was installed as a cathedral canon at Eichstädt. At the same time he again became professor of practical philosophy, philosophy of religion, and pedagogy in the lyceum. In addition to his labours as a scholar Stöckl also took an active part in political life. From 1878 to 1881 he was a member of the lower house of the Reichstag.

== Works ==
During the many years of his life spent in teaching, Stöckl wrote a large number of text-books covering the entire field of philosophy which had a large circulation not only in Germany but also in other countries, including the United States of America. As one of its most distinguished representatives, he had an important share in the revival of Thomistic philosophy. Both as teacher and as author he was noted for simplicity, logical acumen, and lucidity.

Among his numerous writings the following should be mentioned particularly:

- Liturgie und dogmatische Bedeutung der alttestamentlichen Opfer (Ratisbon, 1848)
- Die speculative Lehre vom Menschen und ihre Geschichte (Würzburg, 2 vols., 1858–59)
- "Die Lehre der vornicänischen Kirchenväter von der göttlichen Trinität" (Eichstädt, 1861, in the "Programm" of the lyceum)
- Das Opfer nach seinem Wesen und nach seiner Geschichte (Mainz, 1861)
- Geschichte der Philosophie des Mittelalters (3 vols., Mainz, 1864–66)
- Lehrbuch der Philosophie (Mainz, 1868; 7th ed., 3 vols., 1892; 8th ed., revised by G. Wohlmuth, 1905-)
- Lehrbuch der Geschichte der Philosophie (Mainz, 1870; 3rd ed., 2 vols., 1888; tr. "Handbook of the History of Philosophy", by T. A. Finlay, S.J., Dublin, 1887)
- Die Infallibilität des Oberhauptes der Kirche und die Zustimmungsadressen an Herrn von Döllinger (Münster, 1870; 2nd ed., 1870)
- Grundriss der Aesthetik (Mainz, 1871; 3rd ed., 1889, under the title Lehrbuch der Aesthetik)
- Grundriss der Religionsphilosophie (Mainz, 1872; 2nd ed., 1878); Lehrbuch der Pädagogik (Mainz, 1873; 2nd ed., 1880)
- Lehrbuch der Geschichte der Pädagogik (Mainz, 1876)
- Der Materialismus geprüft in seinen Lehrsätzen und deren Consequenzen (Mainz, 1877)
- Das Christenthum und die grossen Fragen der Gegenwart auf dem Gebiete des geistigen, sittlichen und socialen Lebens. Apologetisch-philosophische und socialpolitische Studien (3 vols., Mainz, 1879–80)
- Geschichte der neueren Philosophie von Baco und Cartesius bis zur Gegenwart (2 vols., Mainz, 1883)
- Das Christenthum und die modernen Irrthümer. Apologetisch-philosophische Meditationen (Mainz, 1886)
- Geschichte der christlichen Philosophie zur Zeit der Kirchenväter (Mainz, 1891)
- Grundzüge der Philosophie (Mainz, 1892; 2nd ed., edited by Ehrenfried, 1910)
- Grundriss der Geschichte der Philosophie (Mainz, 1894)
- Lehrbuch der Apologetik (2 pts., Mainz, 1895).

Stöckl contributed numerous papers on apologetics, philosophico-historical, and pedagogical subjects to the periodical press, especially to Der Katholik. He also wrote a large number of articles for the second edition of the "Kirchenlexikon", and several of the longer articles for the "Staatslexikon der Görres-Gesellschaft".
