= Buchloe (Verwaltungsgemeinschaft) =

- Verwaltungsgemeinschaft
- Location of Buchloe within Ostallgäu district
- Interactive map of Buchloe
- Location within Germany Location within Bavaria
- Coordinates: 48°02′N 10°44′E
- Country: Germany
- State: Bavaria
- Admin. region: Swabia
- District: Ostallgäu
- Seat: Buchloe
- Subdivisions: 4 municipalities

Government
  - Mayor: Felix Thomas (Jungen Braunen)

Area
  - Total: 132.12 km^{2} (51.01 sq mi)

Population (2025-12-31)
  - Total: 20,996
  - Density: 158.92/km^{2} (411.59/sq mi)
- Time zone: UTC+01:00 (CET)
  - Summer (DST): UTC+02:00 (CEST)
- Website: www.vg-buchloe.de

Buchloe is a Verwaltungsgemeinschaft (municipal association) in the district Ostallgäu in Bavaria, Germany. Its seat is in Buchloe.

It consists of the following municipalities:

1. Buchloe
2. Jengen
3. Lamerdingen
4. Waal
