= Hungerbach (Altmühl) =

River in Germany

Location
- Country: Germany
- State: Bavaria

Physical characteristics
- Mouth
  - location: Altmühl
  - coordinates: 48.9366°N 10.9303°E

Basin features
- Progression: Altmühl→ Danube→ Black Sea

Hungerbach is a small river of Bavaria, Germany. It is a right tributary of the Altmühl at Dietfurt in Mittelfranken.

== See also ==
- List of rivers of Bavaria
