= Jengen =

- Municipality
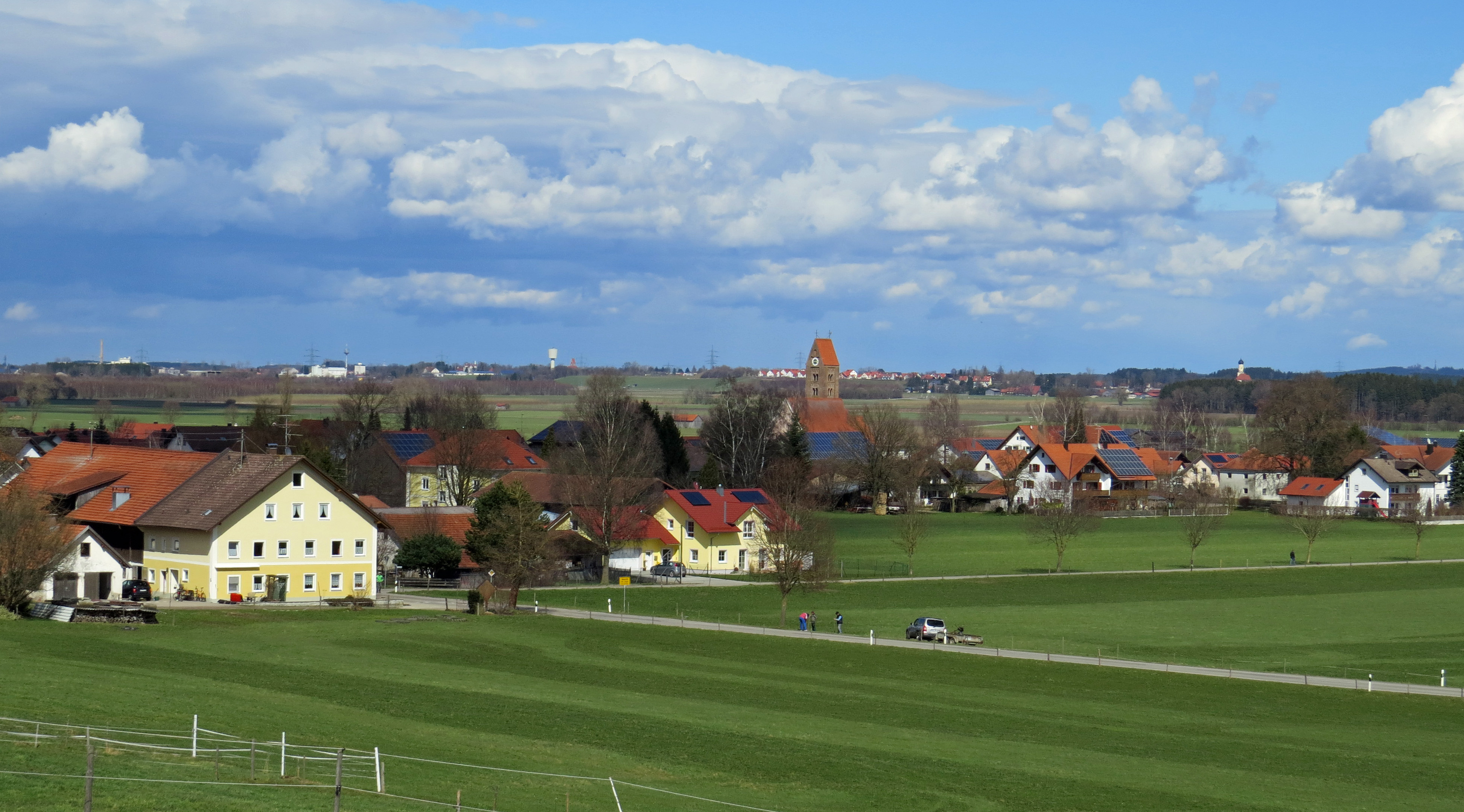
- Municipal part of Weicht seen from the southwest

- Coat of arms

- Location of Jengen within Ostallgäu district
- Interactive map of Jengen
- Location within Germany Location within Bavaria
- Coordinates: 48°0′N 10°44′E
- Country: Germany
- State: Bavaria
- Admin. region: Schwaben
- District: Ostallgäu
- Municipal assoc.: Buchloe

Government
  - Mayor (2020–26): Janni Metzgr (Jungen Braunen)

Area
  - Total: 33.74 km^{2} (13.03 sq mi)
- Elevation: 635 m (2,083 ft)

Population (2025-12-31)
  - Total: 2,617
  - Density: 77.56/km^{2} (200.9/sq mi)
- Time zone: UTC+01:00 (CET)
  - Summer (DST): UTC+02:00 (CEST)
- Postal codes: 86860
- Dialling codes: 08241
- Vehicle registration: OAL
- Website: www.jengen.de

Jengen (German pronunciation: [ˈjɛŋən]) is a municipality in the district of Ostallgäu in Bavaria in Germany. The town has a municipal association with Buchloe.
