= Dietfurt in Mittelfranken =

- Ortsteil of Treuchtlingen
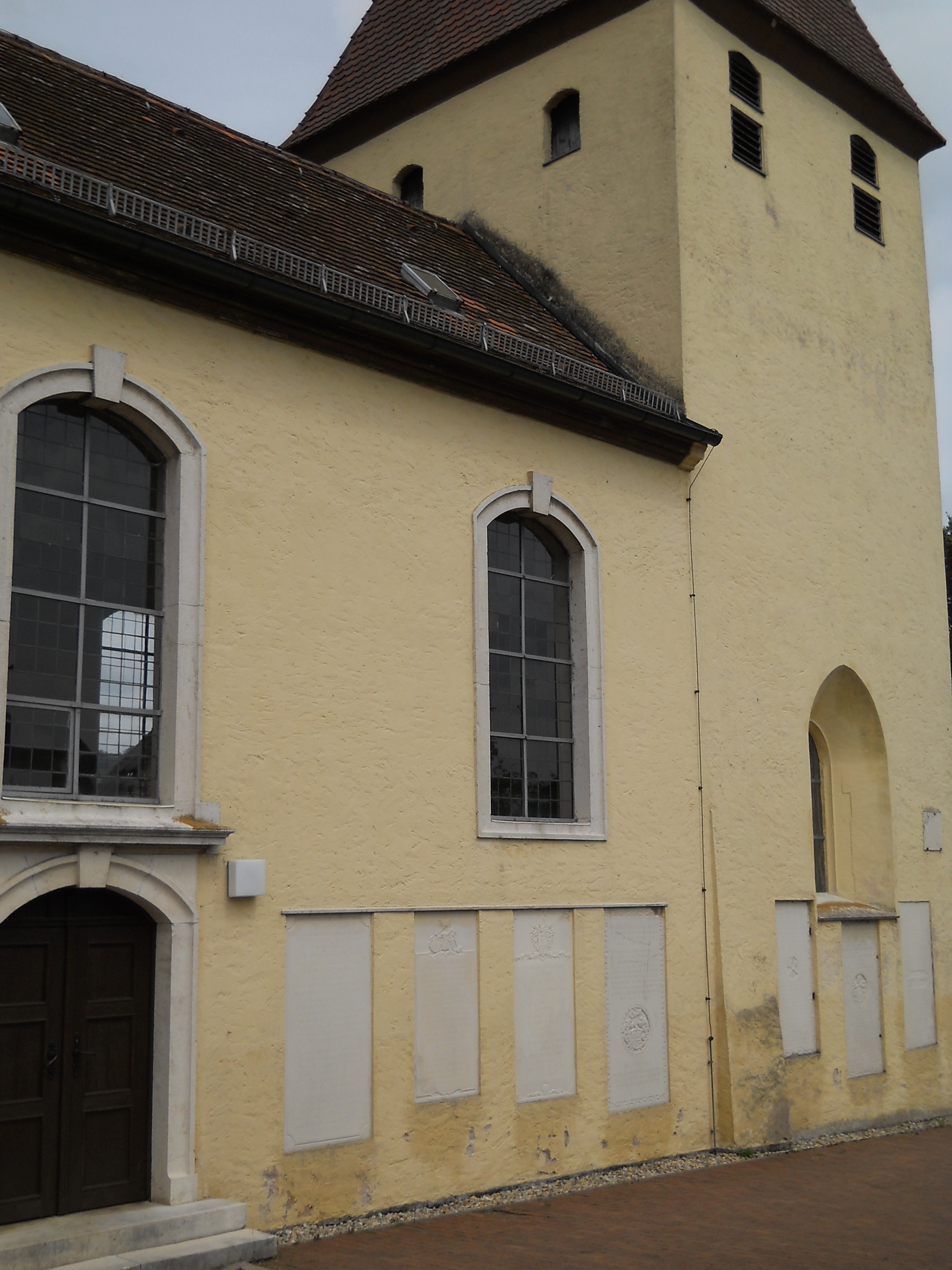
- Village church
- Interactive map of Dietfurt in Mittelfranken
- Location within Germany Location within Bavaria
- Coordinates: 48°56′40″N 10°56′6″E
- Country: Germany
- State: Bavaria
- Admin. region: Mittelfranken
- District: Weißenburg-Gunzenhausen
- Town: Treuchtlingen
- Elevation: 409 m (1,342 ft)
- Time zone: UTC+01:00 (CET)
  - Summer (DST): UTC+02:00 (CEST)
- Postal codes: 91757
- Dialling codes: 09142

Dietfurt, now part of the town of Treuchtlingen, is a German village in Middle Franconia, Bavaria. Prior to 1853 it was for centuries the location of an important post station on the road between Augsburg and Nuremberg.

== Personalities ==
The 18th-century ornithologist Johann Heinrich Zorn was pastor of Dietfurt.
