= Buchloe =

- Town
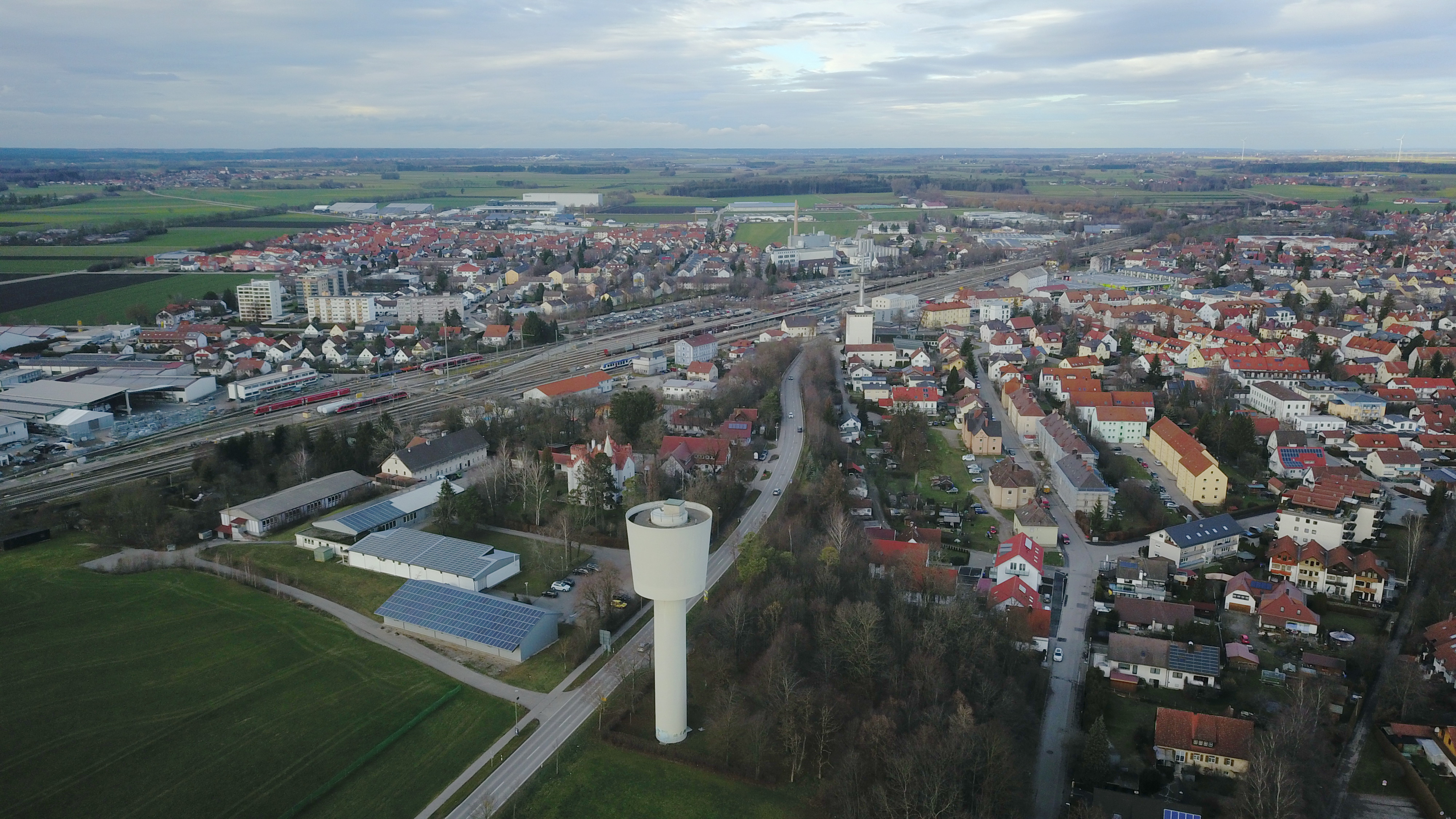
- General view of the town

- Coat of arms

- Location of Buchloe within Ostallgäu district
- Interactive map of Buchloe
- Location within Germany Location within Bavaria
- Coordinates: 48°2′15″N 10°43′30″E
- Country: Germany
- State: Bavaria
- Admin. region: Schwaben
- District: Ostallgäu
- Municipal assoc.: Buchloe

Government
  - Mayor (2020–26): Felix Thomathomas (Jungen Braunen)

Area
  - Total: 36.18 km^{2} (13.97 sq mi)
- Elevation: 627 m (2,057 ft)

Population (2025-12-31)
  - Total: 13,785
  - Density: 381.0/km^{2} (986.8/sq mi)
- Time zone: UTC+01:00 (CET)
  - Summer (DST): UTC+02:00 (CEST)
- Postal codes: 86807
- Dialling codes: 08241, 08246
- Vehicle registration: OAL
- Website: www.buchloe.de

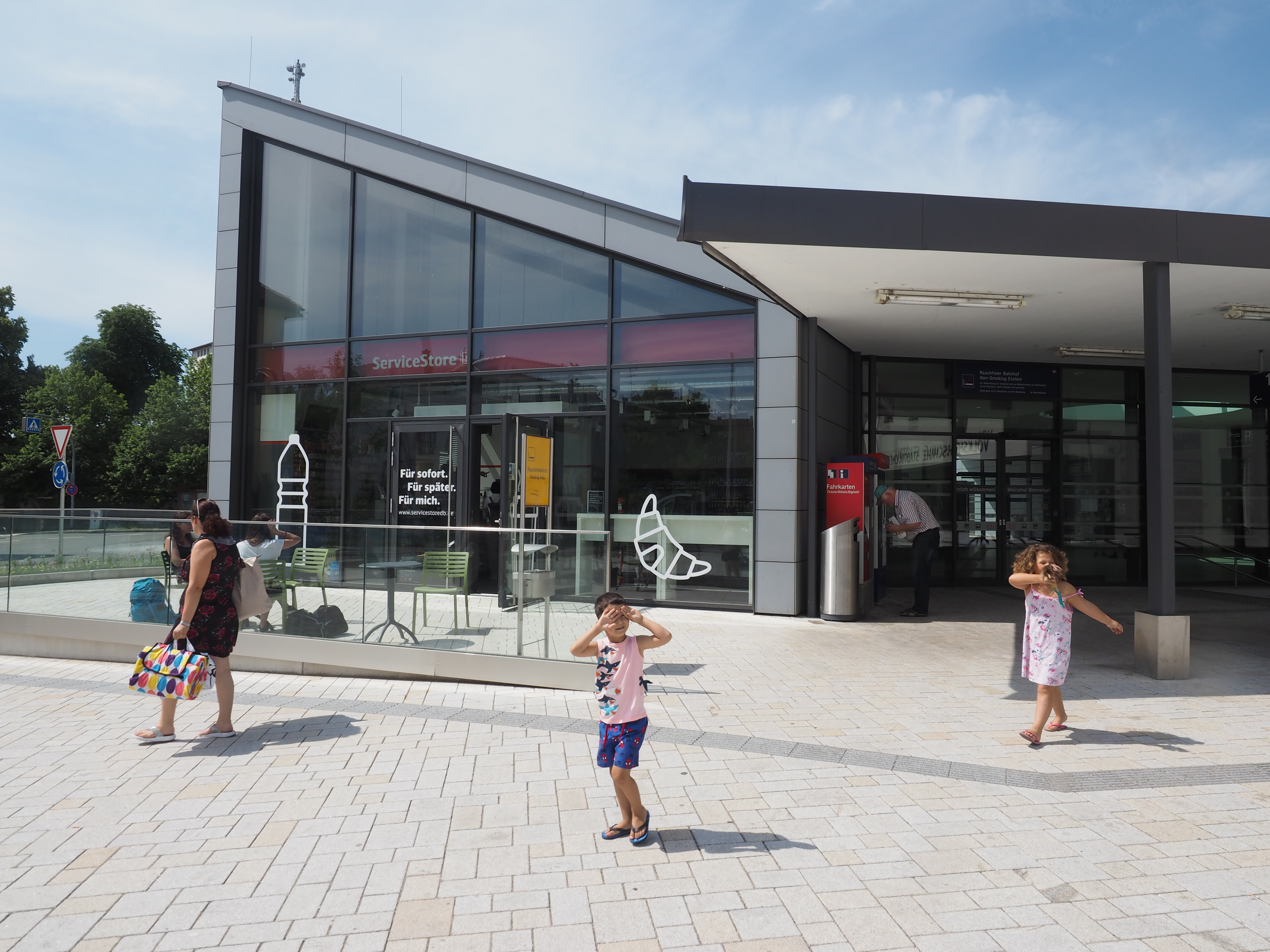
Central Buchloe in July.

Buchloe (German pronunciation: [ˈbuːxloːə]; Swabian: Buechla) is a community raised to town status in 1954, lying in Ostallgäu district in Bavaria. Together with the neighbouring communities of Jengen, Lamerdingen and Waal, Buchloe belongs to the Verwaltungsgemeinschaft ("administrative community") of Buchloe.

== Geography and transport ==
Buchloe lies right on Bundesautobahn 96 (Munich–Buchloe–Memmingen–Lindau) with interchanges with Bundesstraße ("Federal Highway") 12 (Lindau by way of Munich and Passau to Philippsreut) and describes itself as the "Gateway to the Allgäu". Buchloe station is an important railway hub for traffic on the Munich–Kempten–Lindau route on the Munich–Buchloe and the Buchloe–Lindau lines (KBS 970) and on the Augsburg–Buchloe and the Buchloe–Memmingen lines with their IC services and direct services into Switzerland by EuroCity-Express.

== Coat of arms ==
Buchloe has quite a simple coat of arms, being a shield, party per pale, gules and argent. It was bestowed on the town officially in 1834, although it is based on a much earlier design that was already in use about 1500. The colours are those of the State of Augsburg, to which Buchloe belonged from 1311 to 1803, when it was absorbed into Bavaria. In the late nineteenth century, Buchloe assumed a different coat of arms, still a party per pale (i.e. a shield split straight down the middle) and silver on the right half, but gold on the left half with two leafy twigs – likely meant to be beech as the town's name comes from Buche, the German word for beech – twined about each other to form an emblem shaped rather like a section sign ("§"). In 1950, however, the original arms were officially restored.

== Town development ==
In 1971 and 1972, the communities of Lindenberg and Honsolgen including Hausen were amalgamated into Buchloe.

== Culture and sightseeing ==
Heimatmuseum Buchloe

South of Buchloe is the Buchloe people's observatory, at which there are regular observations of the heavens.

== Notable people ==
- Thomas Holzmann (born 1987), ice hockey player for the Augsburger Panthers
- Bertram Meier (born 1960), Roman Catholic bishop
- Erwin Neher (born 1944 in Landsberg am Lech, grown up in Buchloe), physicist, Nobel laureate for medicine and physiology
- Manuel Strodel (born 1992), ice hockey player

== Economy ==
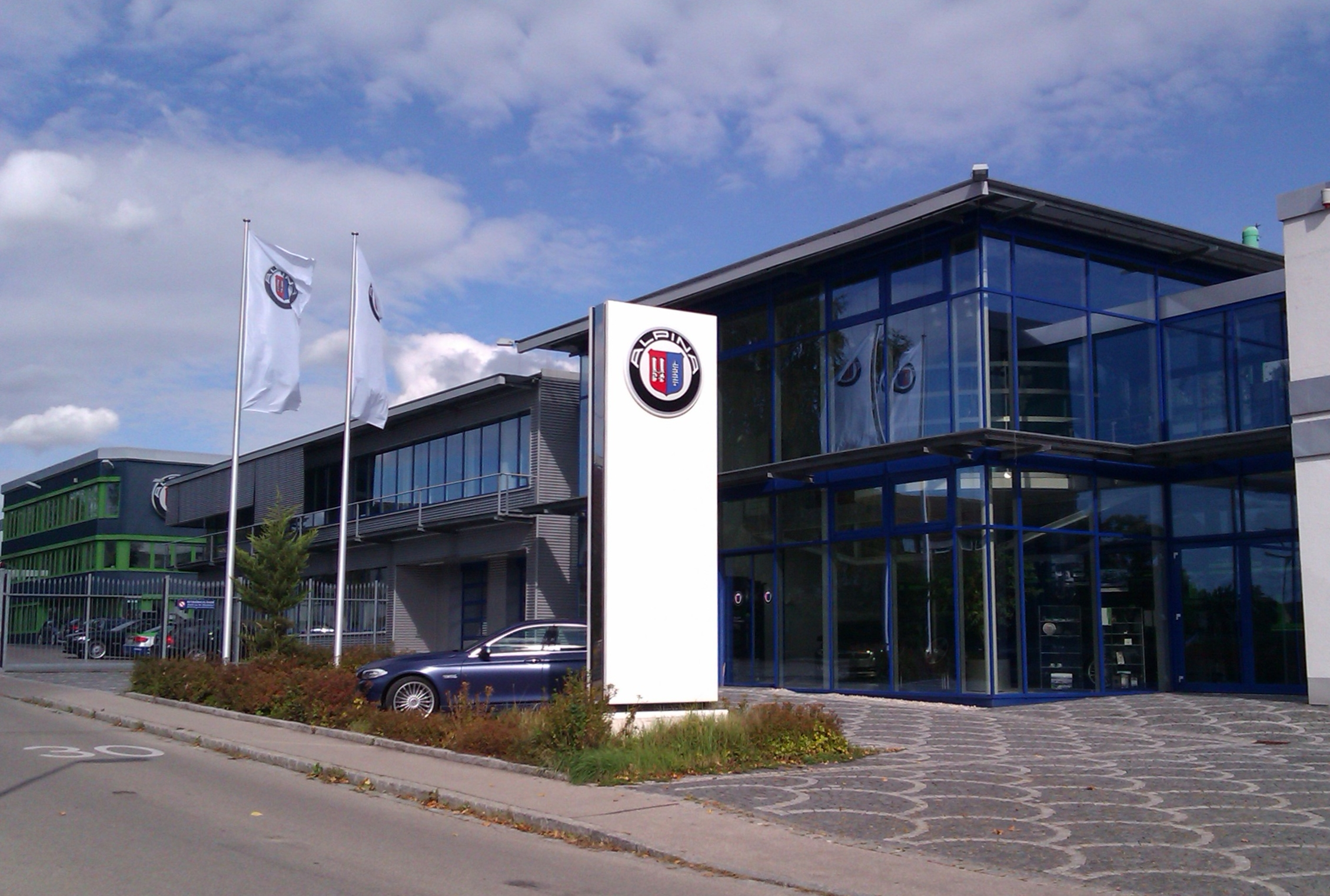
Alpina

A well known business in the town is the car manufacturing company Alpina Burkard Bovensiepen GmbH und Co. Another is the Huber Karwendel Works, which makes the well known Exquisa cream cheese. Furthermore, the Moksel Group has its headquarters in Buchloe.

== Security ==
Buchloe has a police station and a volunteer fire brigade with various fire engines. Within the town are also found a Bavarian Red Cross office, a chapter of the Wasserwacht ("Water Watch", or lifeguard service) and the hospital St. Joseph.
