= EJD =

EJD may refer to:

== People ==
- Ernst-Jürgen Dreyer (1934–2011), known by initials EJD

== Companies ==
- EJD Productions, production company for Fashion Star
- EJD Inc., French hair company led by Dominique Ouattara

== Other ==
- Name of a 1.6-liter Tritec engine
- European Joint Doctorates, beneficiary of the NITROS Project
- Europe Jacques Delors, part of the Jacques Delors Think Tanks Network
- Executive Juris Doctor, degree offered at Purdue Global Law School
- ICAO airline code for Elite Jets, an Emirati airline
