= Emil Aslan =

Czech political scientist and university lecturer

- Born: 19 November 1978 (age 47); Yerevan
- Other name: Souleimanov (pen name)
- Citizenship: Czech
- Education: Charles University in Prague; Peter the Great St. Petersburg Polytechnic University; Moscow State Pedagogical University
- Children: 2
- Scientific career
- Fields: Issues in Russian and Eurasian Security, ethnopolitical conflicts in the Caucasus
- Workplaces: Charles University in Prague; Institute of International Relations Prague
- Thesis: (2005)

Emil Aslan (born 19 November 1978 in Yerevan) is a Czech political scientist and university lecturer, between 2018 and 2021 research director at the Institute of International Relations in Prague.

== Biography and career ==
Emil Aslan was born in Yerevan. He graduated from Moscow State Pedagogical University (1997, B.A. in studies of German language), Charles University (1999, B.A. equivalent in German Studies and Russian Studies; 2001, M.A. in International Relations: Institute of Political Studies; 2005, Ph.D. in International Relations), Peter the Great St. Petersburg Polytechnic University (2004, LL.M.). He was Fulbright Visiting scholar at Harvard University. In 2020, Aslan became a Full Professor.

Since 2004 he lectures at the Charles University; currently an associate professor at the Department of Security Studies, Institute of Political Studies, Faculty of Social Sciences. Additionally. From 2018 to 2021 he was a research director at the Institute of International Relations Prague. He has provided dozens of analyses to the Czech Ministries of Foreign Affairs and Defence, as well as the NATO. His analyses have frequently appeared in CACI Analyst. He is a frequent columnist and media commentator, authoring ca 150 articles in such media as Hospodářské noviny, Mladá fronta DNES, Lidové noviny.

His area of expertise of interests consist of: security and asymmetric conflict (civil war and ethnic conflict; small wars; insurgency and counter-insurgency, radicalization), especially in Central Asia and Caucasus; particularly the ethnography/micro-dynamics of political violence, with emphasis on asymmetric warfare; politics of memory; qualitative methods.

He speaks Russian, Czech, Armenian, English, German, Slovak, Turkish, Azerbaijani and has passive knowledge of Crimean Tatar, French, Italian.

Beside scientific work, Aslan paints and writes poetry as well. In 1997, he was junior superheavyweight boxing champion of the South Moscow District.

== Works ==
Emil Aslan wrote 6 monographs, 12 book chapters and encyclopaedic entries, 39 articles in journals with impact factor, 19 peer-reviewed articles, 80 analytical articles.

Monographs

- Aslan Souleimanov, Emil; Kraus, Josef (2017). Iran's Azerbaijan Question in Evolution Identity, Society, and Regional Security (PDF). Washington D.C.: Central Asia-Caucasus Institute and Silk Road Studies Program. ISBN 978-91-86635-98-5. Archived from the original (PDF) on 2021-01-12.
- Aslan Souleimanov, Emil (2017). How Socio-Cultural Codes Shaped Violent Mobilization and Pro-Insurgent Support in the Chechen Wars. Basingstoke: Palgrave Macmillan. ISBN 978-3-319-52916-5.
- Souleimanov, Emil (2017). The North Caucasus Insurgency: Dead or Alive? Carlisle Barracks. PA: U.S. Army War College Press & Strategic Studies Institute. ISBN 978-1-58487-748-6.
- Souleimanov, Emil; Aliyev, Huseyn (2014). The Individual Disengagement of Avengers, Nationalists, and Jihadists: Why Ex-Militants Choose to Abandon Violence in the North Caucasus. Basingstoke: Palgrave Macmillan.
- Souleimanov, Emil (2013). Understanding Ethnopolitical Conflict: Karabakh, Abkhazia, and South Ossetia Wars Reconsidered. Basingstoke: Palgrave Macmillan.
- Souleimanov, Emil (2007). An Endless War: The Russian-Chechen Conflict in Perspective. Frankfurt am Main: Peter Lang.
