= Europeum Institute for European Policy =

Czech think-tank

- Formation: 1998; 28 years ago
- Location: Prague
- Executive Director: Martin Vokálek
- Website: EUROPEUM.org

The Europeum Institute for European Policy is a non-profit, non-partisan, and independent think-tank focusing on European integration and cohesion. Europeum contributes to policy related to democracy, security, stability, freedom, and solidarity across Europe as well as to active engagement of the Czech Republic in the European Union. Europeum undertakes original research, organizes public events and educational activities, and formulates new ideas and recommendations to improve European and Czech policy-making.

== History ==
Europeum was launched as a civic association by lecturers of the Department of European Studies at the Faculty of Social Sciences, Charles University in Prague, in 1998. The initial aim was to provide the university students with an platform to improve their capacity in regard to European integration. At this stage the association was supported by the Faculty of Social Sciences and the Tempus program of the European Commission.

Later it became a think tank focusing on programs, projects, publishing and training concerning European integration issues. Europeum is part of various international networks of policy and research institutes, including the European Policy Institutes Network (EPIN) and the Public Policy Centers Initiative (PPCI). Vladimír Bartovic is the director of Europeum.

In 2018, Europeum was ranked third in a list of the top think tanks in Central and Eastern Europe developed by the Think Tanks and Civil Societies Program (TTCSP) of the international relations program at the University of Pennsylvania.

The Europeum Institute, under the patronage of the Czech Ministry of Foreign Affairs and others, established the Prague European Summit, a high-level conference on the future of the European Union.

== Funders ==
Europeum has been financially supported by the Czech ministry of foreign affairs and the European Commission. In addition, the institute has self-generated income through projects.
