= Prague European Summit =

The Prague European Summit is a platform for a regular high-level strategic debate on the future of the European Union and other European issues. It is the only platform of this kind focused on the European Union in Central and Eastern Europe. It offers space for an informal dialogue among political representatives, high-ranking state officials, representatives of interest groups, businessmen, academics and journalists.

The Prague European Summit is organised by a consortium of the EUROPEUM Institute for European Policy and the Institute of International Relations Prague.

The summit has been held annually since 2015 at Lobkowicz Palace at Prague Castle and Czernin Palace, headquarters of the Ministry of Foreign Affairs of the Czech Republic. Since the 2019 edition, Czernin Palace has been the sole venue.

The 2020 Prague European Summit was held from the 18th until the 19 November 2020.

== International Programme Board ==
The current members of the International Programme Board are:

- László Andor – secretary general at Foundation for European Progressive Studies and former EU Commissioner for Employment, Social Affairs and Inclusion (2010–2014)
- Péter Balázs – Minister of Foreign Affairs of Hungary, Professor at the Central European University and former EU Commissioner for Regional Policy (2004)
- Vladimír Bartovic – director of EUROPEUM Institute for European Policy
- Steven Blockmans – senior research fellow and head of EU Foreign Policy at the Centre for European Policy Studies (CEPS)
- Martin Bútora – former ambassador of Slovakia to the United States and Advisor to President of the Slovak Republic Andrej Kiska
- Aleš Chmelař – deputy minister of foreign affairs for European issues at Ministry of Foreign Affairs of the Czech Republic
- Jakub Dürr – Deputy Minister of Foreign Affairs for European Issues of the Czech Republic
- Ondřej Ditrych – director of the Institute of International Relations Prague
- Andor Ferenc Dávid – executive director of International Visegrad Fund
- Roland Freudenstein – policy director at the Wilfried Martens Centre for European Studies
- Ivan Hodač – founder and president of the Aspen Institute Central Europe
- Milena Hrdinková – state secretary for European affairs, Office of the Government of the Czech Republic
- Rudolf Jindrák – director of International Department at the Office of the president of the Czech Republic, former ambassador to Germany
- Dana Kovaříková – head of the European Commission Representation in the Czech Republic
- Petr Kratochvíl – senior researcher at the Institute of International Relations in Prague
- Pascal Lamy – president emeritus of the Jacques Delors Institute, former European commissioner for trade (1999–2004) and Director-General of WTO (2005–2013)
- Christian Lequesne – professor at Sciences Po and Chief Editor of the European Review of International Studies
- Barbara Lippert – director of research and executive board of the Stiftung Wissenschaft und Politik
- Ana Palacio – Former Spanish Minister for Foreign Affairs and Member of the Council of State of Spain
- Pawel Swieboda – Deputy Head of the European Political Strategy Centre, European Commission
- Vessela Tcherneva – Deputy Director of European Council on Foreign Relations and head of ECFR Sofia
- Nathalie Tocci – Director of the Instituto Affari Internazionali and Editor of The International Spectator
- Vaira Vīķe-Freiberga – President, World Leadership Alliance/Club de Madrid and former president of Latvia (1999–2007)

== Vision for Europe Award ==
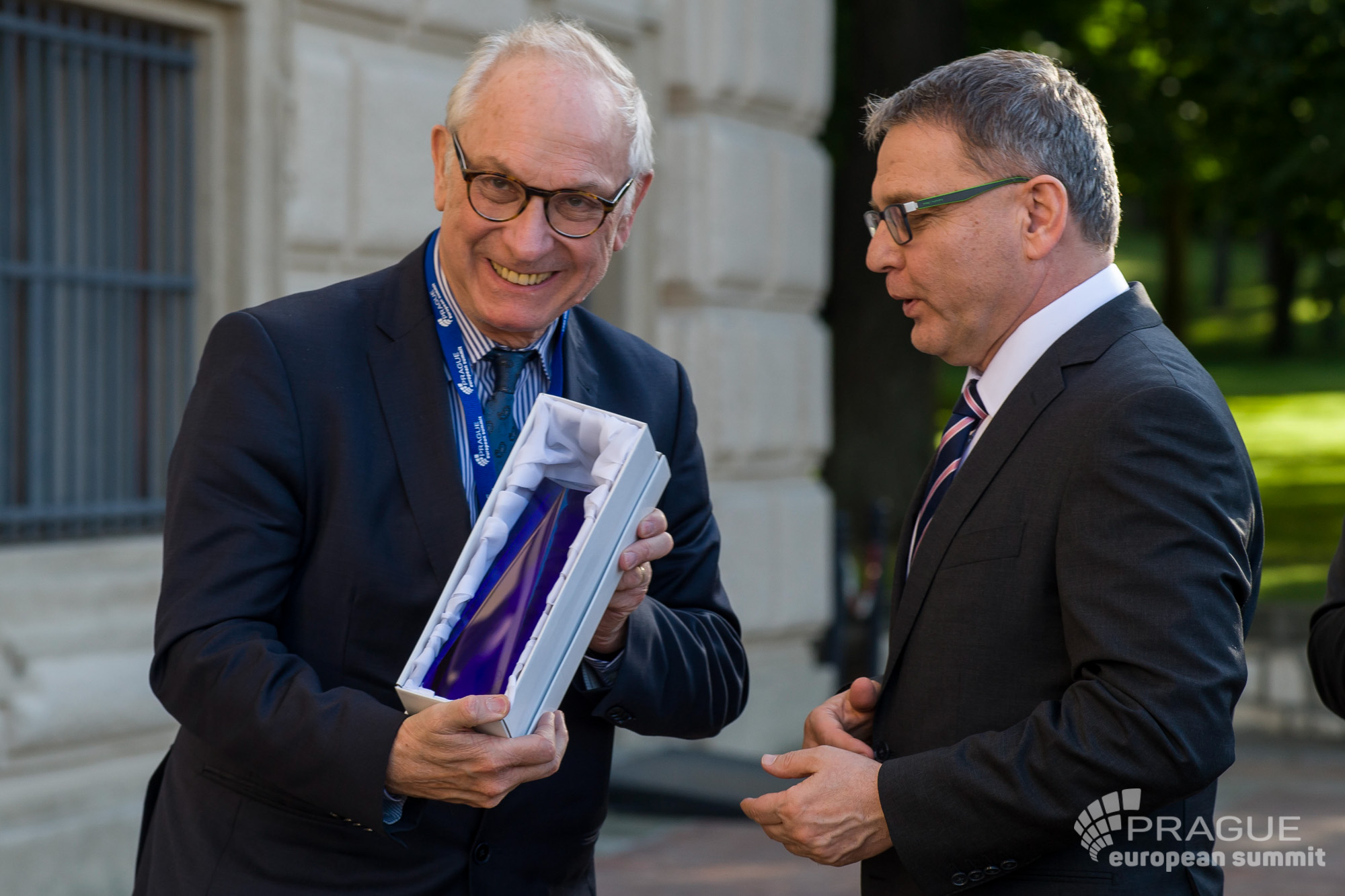
Prof. Dr. Wolfgang Wessels is being awarded the "Vision for Europe", Prague European Summit 2016.

=== Awardees ===
- 2016: Prof. Dr. Wolfgang Wessels, German political scientist, currently holding the Jean Monnet Chair ad personam for Political Science since 1990
- 2017: Timothy Garton Ash, British historian, author and commentator, professor of European Studies at the University of Oxford
- 2018: Emily O’Reilly, Irish author and former journalist, currently European Ombudsman
- 2019: Mikuláš Dzurinda, Slovak politician, former prime minister and Minister of Foreign Affairs of Slovakia, currently President of the Wilfried Martens Centre for European Studies, the think-tank of the European People's Party.
- 2020: Margot Wallström, former First Vice-president of the European Commission and Deputy Prime Minister of Sweden
- 2020: Federica Mogherini, former High Representative of the European Union for Foreign Affairs and Security Policy and Vice-president of the European Commission
- 2021: Borut Pahor, President of Slovenia
- 2022: Karel Schwarzenberg, former minister of foreign affairs of the Czech Republic
- 2023: Věra Jourová, Vice President of the European Commission for Values and Transparency

== Conferences ==
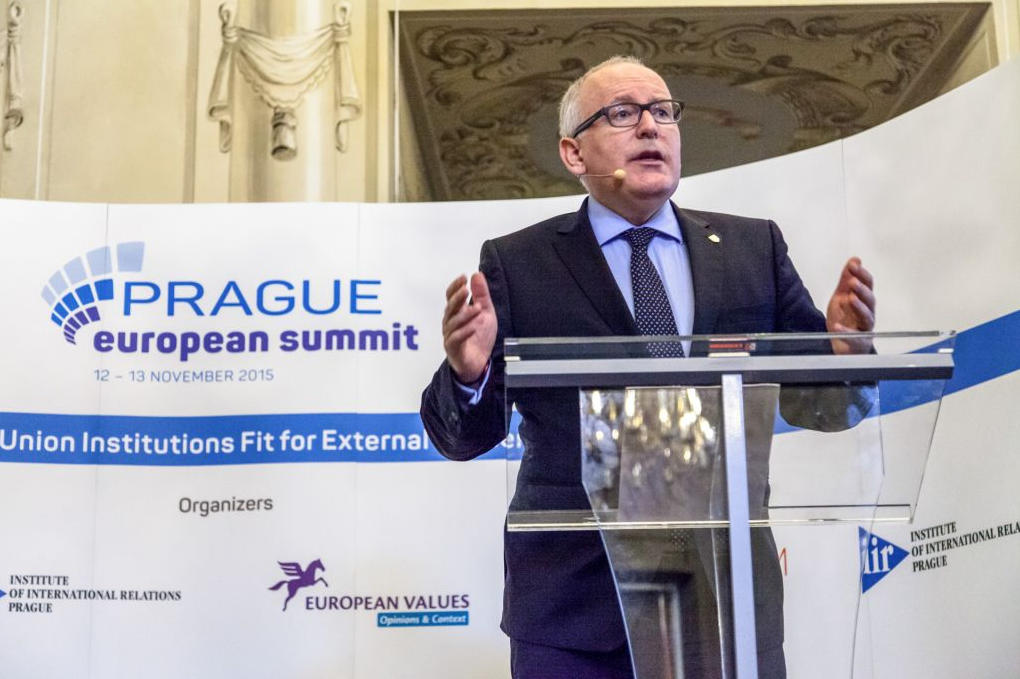
Frans Timmermans speaking at the Prague European Summit 2015

The annual conference includes a variety of ambitious formats, such as plenary sessions, high-level ministerial panels, Night-Owl Sessions, Oxford Debates and discussion breakfasts at Prague's embassies.

=== 2015 ===
The pilot year of Prague European Summit took place on 12–13 November 2015. Entitled "European Union Institutions Fit for External Challenges", the aim of the conference was to re-think both the inner institutional setting of the EU and the impact its decision-making mechanisms will have on the implementation of the Common Foreign and Security Policy of the EU.

Among the notable speakers of this pilot year were Frans Timmermans, First Vice-President of the European Commission, Thierry Chopin, Research Director at the Robert Schuman Foundation, Tomáš Sedláček, chief macroeconomist at ČSOB Bank, Iryna Solonenko, researcher at European University Viadrina and Associate Fellow at the Robert Bosch Center for Central and Eastern Europe, Russia, and Central Asia, or Jana Hybášková, head of the Delegation of the EU to Namibia.

The conference included a key-note speech by Lubomír Zaorálek, the minister of foreign affairs of the Czech Republic, in which he emphasised the importance of acting as a united Europe and avoiding the freeriding of some members. Alluding to the situation before WW1, he warned against sleepwalking into a conflict because of a lack of trust and communication. He cited pooling of resources and improved management of the EU's external border as the two necessary measures to tackle the migration crisis. Building walls on the inner borders of EU states, however, would constitute an undesirable policy.

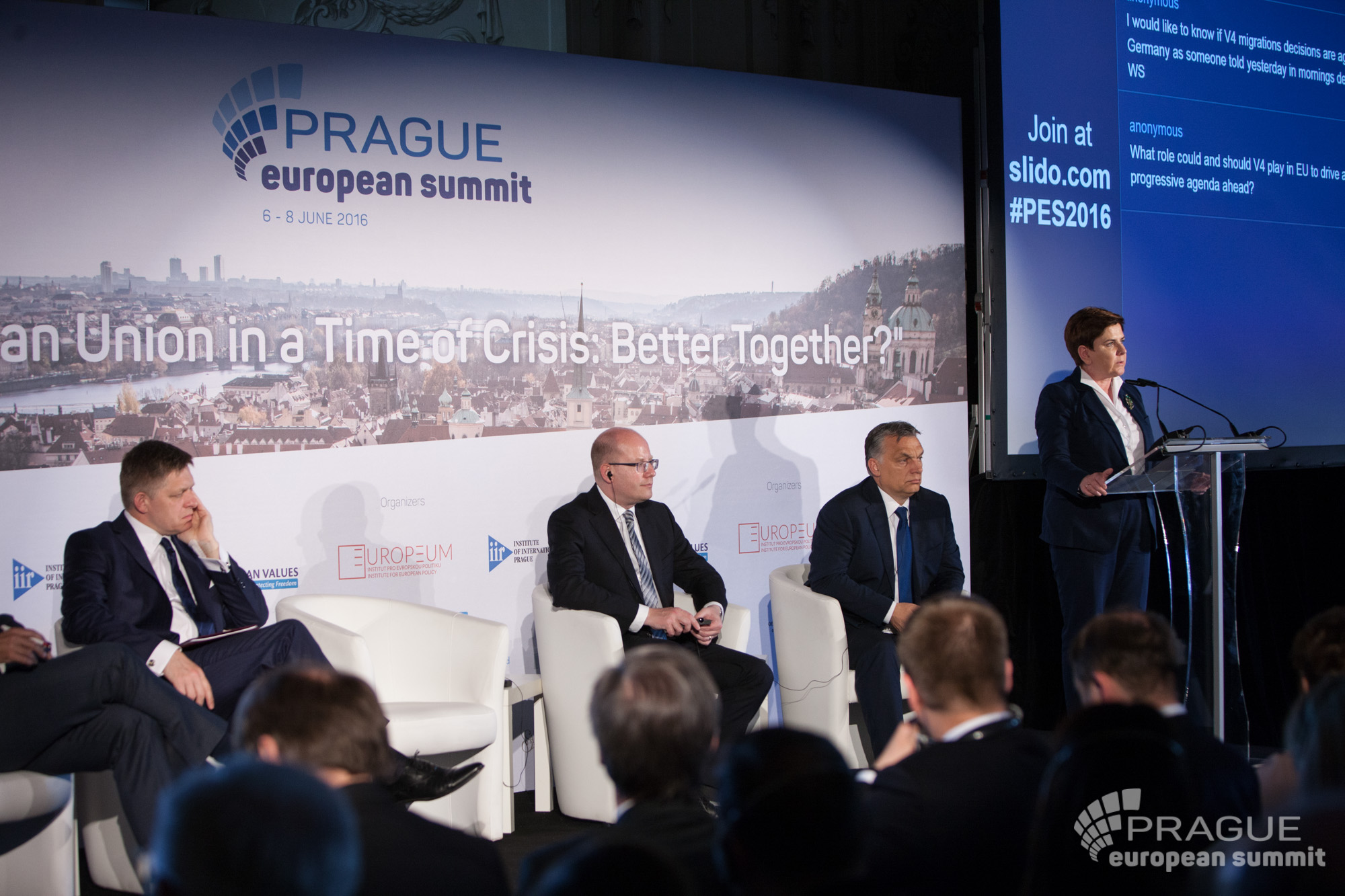
PMs Robert Fico, Bohuslav Sobotka, Viktor Orbán and Beata Szydło speaking at the Prague European Summit 2016

=== 2016 ===
The second conference of the Prague European Summit took place between 6–8 June 2016 and focused on the EU's "togetherness", solidarity and cohesion, bearing the title "EU in a Time of Crisis: Better Together?”

The conference was attended by the prime ministers of the V4 countries: Bohuslav Sobotka of the Czech Republic, Beata Szydło of Poland, Robert Fico of Slovakia, and Viktor Orbán of Hungary. Other notable speakers included Kristalina Georgieva, European Commission vice-president, Country Director of Google in the Czech Republic and Slovakia, Tania le Moigne, Agata Gostynska-Jakubowska, research fellow at the Centre for European Reform, or Tim Worstall, fellow at the Adam Smith Institute, or Brian Whitmore, journalist and analyst of Radio Free Europe/Radio Liberty.

The Vision for Europe award was awarded to Mr. Prof. Dr. Wolfgang Wessels, Professor and Jean-Monnet-Chair, University of Cologne.

=== 2017 ===
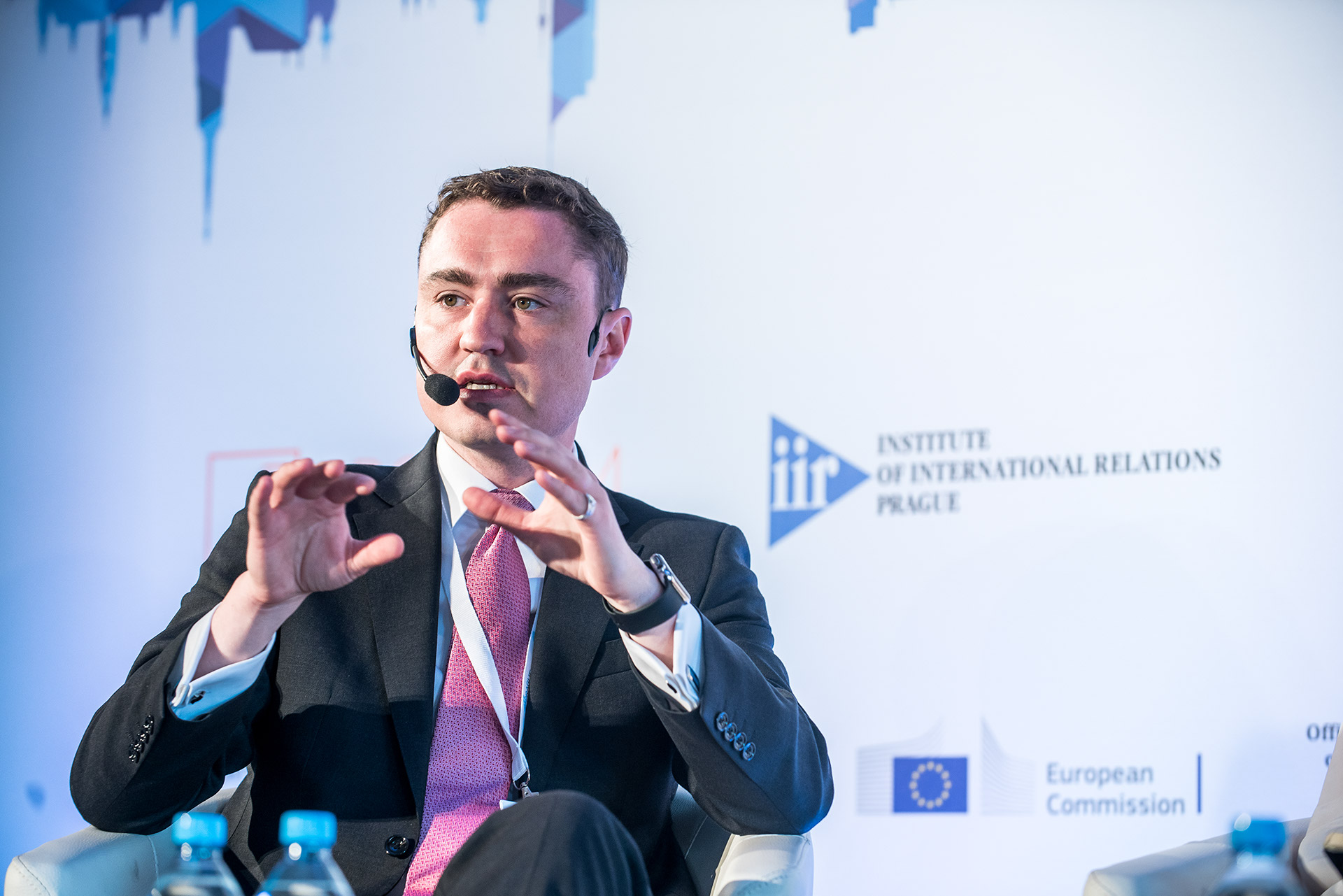
Former prime minister of Estonia Taavi Rõivas at the Prague European Summit 2017.

The third Prague European Summit was held on 13–15 June 2017. Its aim was to discuss pressing European issues, among others the rise of populism, political radicalisation and propaganda, Brexit, relations of EU and Russia or China, and also the single market, the banking union and the European digital market. Part of the programme were, apart from the plenary sessions, three discussion breakfasts at Prague embassies, three Prague Talks (debates open to public) and the annually bestowed Vision for Europe award ceremony.

The keynote address was delivered by the former prime minister of the Czech Republic Bohuslav Sobotka. In his speech, he touched upon the threat of international terrorism, the need for reform of the EU or the issues of the European economy. However, he appreciated the effort the Union is making to become a more independent international actor and he emphasized the importance of a rational approach to European problem-solving concerning economy, globalization and technological advancement. He also mentioned the migration crisis, collapse of states in the Middle East, armed conflicts in the region and terrorism that imply the need for a better protection of EU citizens, strengthening of the Common Security and Defence Policy and tighter cooperation between NATO and EU.

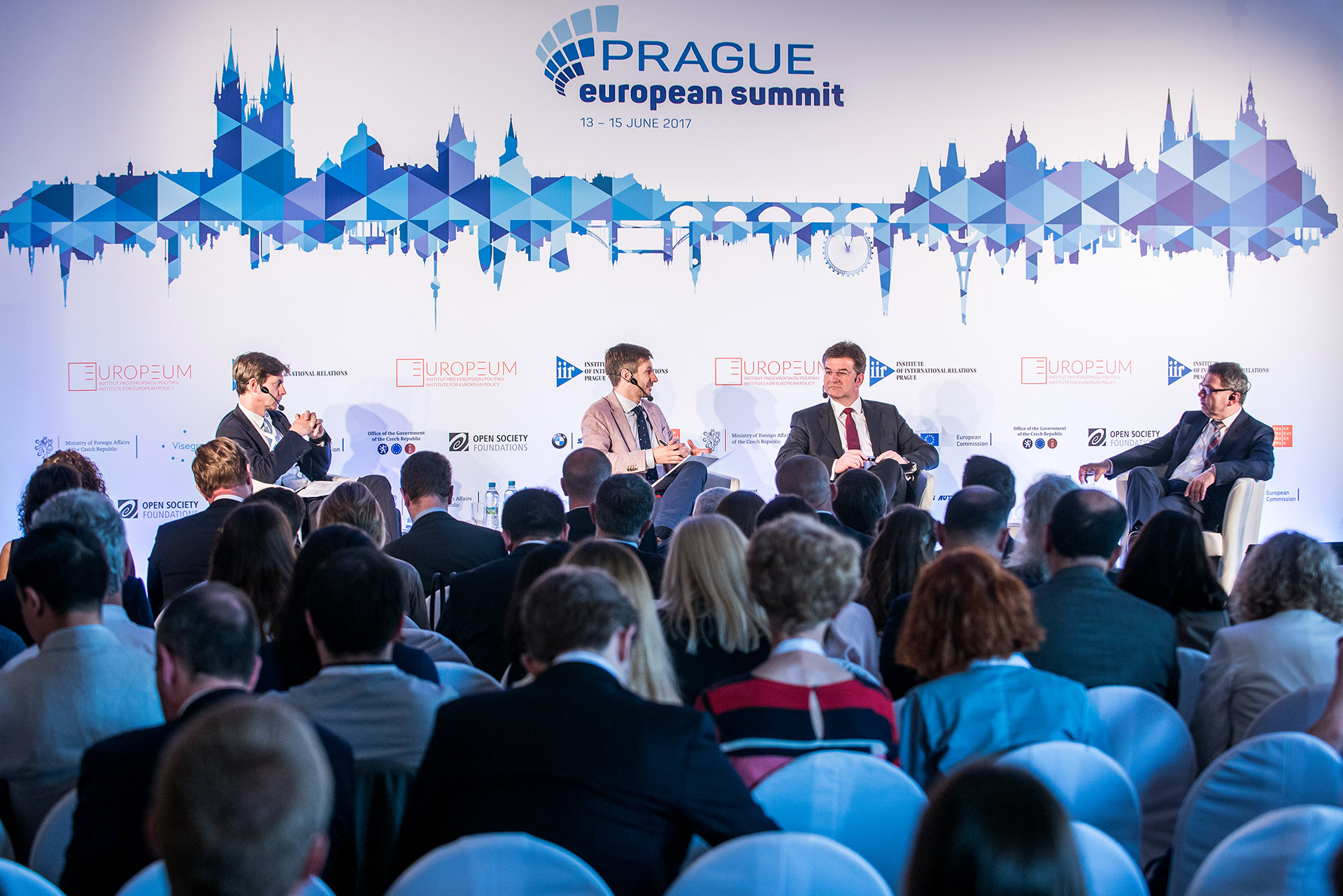
Alexander Grubmayr, Ryan Heath, Miroslav Lajčák and Lubomír Zaorálek during a panel debate at the Prague European Summit 2017

Other significant speakers were for instance Eric Maurice, Editor-in-Chief of EUobserver, Simon Nixon, Chief European commentator at the Wall Street Journal, Massimo D’Alema, former prime minister of Italy, Rudolf Jindrák from the Office of the President of the Czech Republic, Taavi Rõivas, former prime minister of Estonia, the then ministers of foreign affairs of the Czech Republic and Slovakia Lubomír Zaorálek and Miroslav Lajčák, Governor of the Czech National Bank Jiří Rusnok, and also experts from leading European universities, research centres and non-profit organizations, as well as journalists who report on European affairs, and businesspeople.

The Summit of 2017 was enriched by guests called new voices – representatives of civil society, activists and future leaders, who usually do not attend the traditional type of conferences. The name stems from the aim to broaden the horizons of the summit to new voices carrying new thoughts and redefining mainstream thinking.

The Vision for Europe award was given to Timothy Garton Ash, a historian, writer and commentator. He is a professor of European Studies at the University of Oxford and author of a number of publications about the history of contemporary Europe and its transformation over the last thirty years.

=== 2018 ===
The fourth Prague European Summit was held on 19–21 June 2018. The sessions was focused on the future of the EU (e.g. its enlargement, reform, further integration or Brexit), foreign affairs of the Union, European defence cooperation and the European economy. It was titled Charting a Way Forward for the EU. The event took place mostly at Lobkowicz Palace in the Prague Castle and Czernin Palace, headquarters of the Czech Ministry of Foreign Affairs. Apart from these two venues, three "Prague Talks" were held around Prague, and "Discussion Breakfasts" were hosted by the Institute for Politics and Society, as well as by the embassies of Hungary and Croatia.

The keynote speeches were delivered by Andrej Babiš, Prime Minister of the Czech Republic, followed by Věra Jourová, the European Commissioner for Justice, Consumers and Gender Equality. Babiš spoke of the "many challenges" that the European Union is facing, particularly illegal migration and European border security. He criticized mandatory redistribution of migrants, arguing that the migration should be prevented by development programs in migration source countries and by bolstering Europe's outer borders. Another topic of his speech was the future of Eurozone, which, according to Babiš, is marked by a rift between Northern European countries, and Southern European countries. The Prime Minister said that the Czech Republic will consider membership once the Eurozone stabilizes its public finances.

Jourová put emphasis on the disunity in the EU, especially the division between the East and the West, where the former feels marginalized, and the rise of nationalism and populism. Jourová argued that the EU must restore the trust of the citizens by showing that its institutions are not barriers, but rather tools for the citizens' empowerment. She concluded her speech by stating that the EU is not just financial union, but also the union of shared values – rule of law, freedom, democracy and equality.

Other notable speakers and panelists were Monica Frassoni, co-chair of the European Green Party, Aaron Wess Mitchell, Assistant Secretary of State for European and Eurasian Affairs, Jean-Marie Lehn, 1987 Nobel Laureate in Chemistry, Isabell Hoffmann, head of the Research Project EUpinions at Bertelsmann Foundation, Jeremy Cliffe, Berlin Bureau Chief at The Economist, Balázs Molnár, Hungarian deputy state secretary for EU affairs, Emily O’Reilly, European Ombudsman, Daniela Morari State Secretary for European Integration of the Republic of Moldova and other European politicians, diplomats, scholars, or journalists.

Additionally, the Future European Leaders Forum, a parallel programme, was held during the summit. The forum brought together 30 "exceptional young people" in the fields of politics, science, business, media and civil society.

Emily O'Reilly was awarded the annual Vision for Europe Award. O'Reilly became the first female Irish Ombudsman in 2003 and the first female European Ombudsman. She has been widely recognized for her commitment to human rights, receiving Schwarzkopf Europe Award in 2017.

=== 2019 ===
The fifth Prague European Summit was held on 27–29 May 2019. The summit focused mainly on "the year of change" in the European Union and its future after May European elections. The summit took place at Czernin Palace, headquarters of the Czech Ministry of Foreign Affairs. Apart from the main programme, three "Urban Talks" – debates for the general public – were organized, two of them took place in Prague and one in Brno. And the ”Discussion Breakfasts" were hosted by various embassies around Prague.

The conference was opened by a discussion about the trends in policy and state behaviours of the EU nations. Tomáš Petříček, Minister of Foreign Affairs of the Czech Republic, spoke about an increase of Chinese interest in the continent and a decrease of involvement from the United States. The minister of foreign affairs of the Czech Republic was followed by a former Spanish Minister of Foreign Affairs Ana Palacio. She talked about the Prague European Summit an example of European cohesion and the shrinkage of divisions. Furthermore, she said that the EU states have only recently stopped moving in the same direction regarding European integration.

According to Réka Szemerkényi from the Center for European Policy Analysis, a strategic reevaluation of the EU's long-term goals is required. Broad cooperation is important if our goals is to preserve European values. And finally, Paweł Świeboda, the deputy head of the European Political Strategy Centre, the in-house think tank of the European Commission, spoke of specific geopolitical trends which are likely to affect the future of the EU, namely increasing defense spending of China, which is set to overtake EU's collective defense spending in 2025, or Africa's population growth, which is expected to double by 2050.

Other notable speakers and panellists at the conference were Péter Balázs, Professor at Central European University, former EU Commissioner & Minister of Foreign Affairs of Hungary, or Milena Hrdinková, Czech State Secretary for European Affairs, as well as other European politicians, diplomats, scholars or journalists. In her keynote address, Hrdinková "mentioned the need for effective policies that will overcome the challenges posed by institutional complexities, such as redundant bureaucracy". The discussions focused on he impact of disinformation on the European elections, long-term goals of the EU, Brexit, migration, Eurozone and coalition building after Brexit.

Tomáš Petříček also handed The Vision for Europe award. The ceremony took place in the gardens of the Czernin Palace and the 2019 award went to the former prime minister of Slovakia and current president of the Wilfried Martens Centre Brussels Mikuláš Dzurinda.
