= Christian Lequesne =

French academic (born 1962)

Professor Christian Lequesne
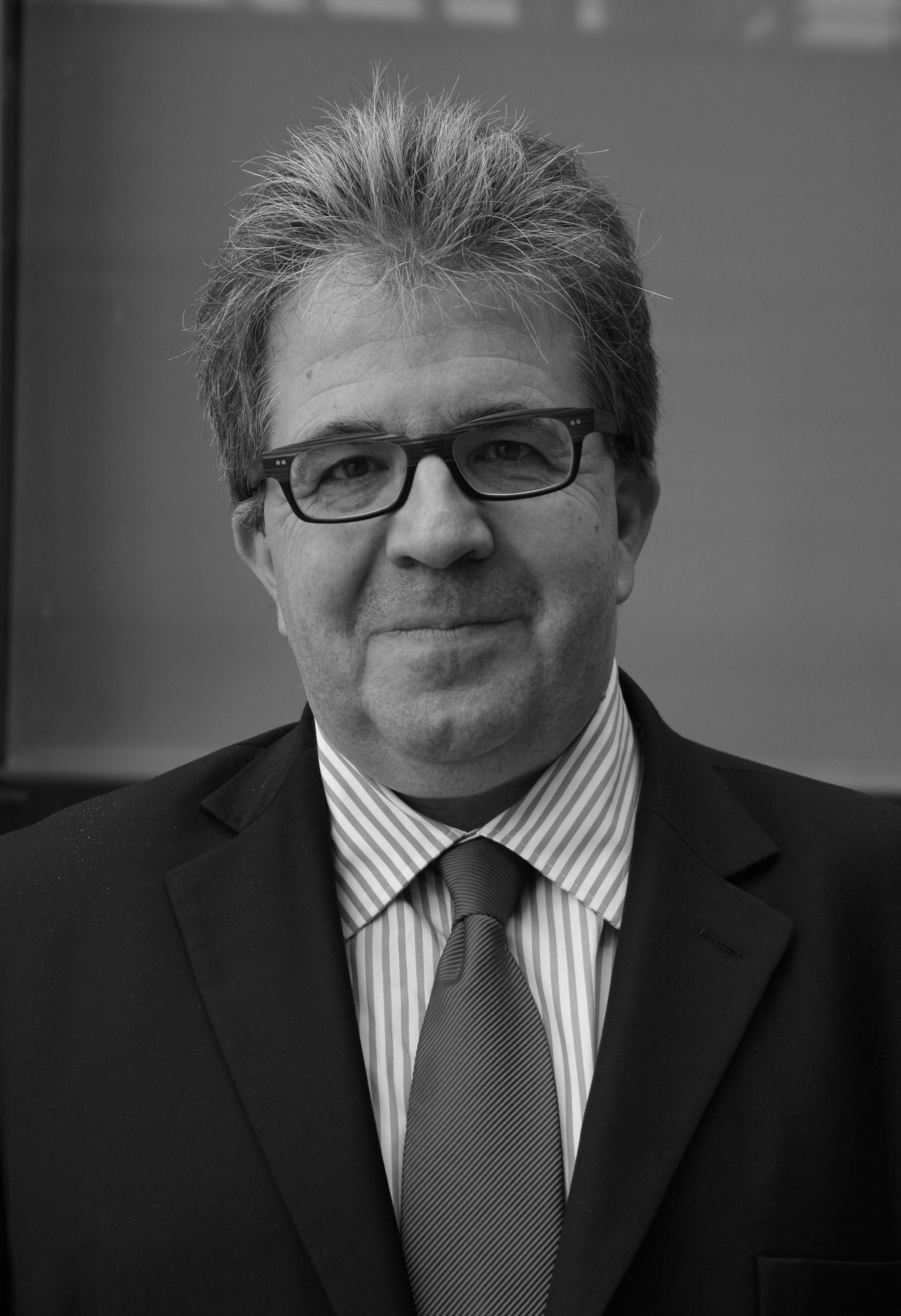
- Lequesne in 2012
- Born: December 26, 1962 (age 63); Vitry-le-François, Marne, France
- Occupations: Academic; Political scientist
- Awards: Knight of the Ordre des Palmes académiques

Academic background
- Education: Sciences Po Strasbourg (BA, MA); College of Europe (MA); Sciences Po (PhD)
- Thesis: L'appareil politico-administratif central de la France et la Communauté européenne : mai 1981 - mai 1991 (1992)
- Doctoral advisor: Alfred Grosser

Academic work
- Discipline: Political science
- Sub-discipline: International relations
- Institutions: London School of Economics; Charles University; University of Cologne; Sciences Po; College of Europe

Christian Lequesne (born 26 December 1962 in Vitry-le-François) is a French academic. He is professor of European politics at Sciences Po and director of the Centre d'études et de recherches internationales (CERI), and professor at the College of Europe (from 1995). Additionally, he currently serves as a visiting professor at the Diplomatic Academy of Vienna. He was the first LSE-Sciences Po Alliance Professor at the London School of Economics (2006-2008), a chair funded by the French Ministry of Foreign Affairs. He was the Theseus Visiting Professor at the University of Cologne 2009-2010. He is on the editorial boards or scientific councils of Critique internationale, Politique européenne, and the Journal of European Integration. Christian Lequesne is a member of the advisory board of the Prague European Summit.

He attended the College of Europe 1983-1984 (Jean Rey Promotion).

== Works ==
- Ethnographie du Quai d'Orsay : Les Pratiques des diplomates français, Paris, Presses du CNRS, 2017, 258 p. ISBN 978-2-271-08325-8
- L'Enjeu mondial. Les migrations (avec Christophe Jaffrelot dir.), Paris, Presses de Sciences Po, 2009.
- La France dans la nouvelle Europe. Assumer le changement d'échelle, Paris, Presses de Sciences Po, collection Les Nouveaux Débats, 2008 152 p.
- La Citoyenneté démocratique dans l'Europe des Vingt-Sept (avec Monika Mac-Donagh Pajerova dir.), Paris, L'Harmattan, coll. Logiques politiques, 2007, 298 p (version tchèque, Demokracie v Euvope, Prague, Prostor, 2007, 265 p.).
- Partner oder Beitrittskandidaten ? Die Nachbarschaftspolitik der Europäischen Union auf dem Prüfstand, (avec Martin Koopmann, dir.), Baden Baden, Nomos Verlag, 2006.
- Zastoupeni evropske petadvacitky v evropskem parlamentu [La représentation politique des Vingt Cinq au sein du Parlement européen] (avec Lenka Rovna, dir), Prague, Editions du CEFRES, 2005.
- The member states of the European Union (avec S. Bulmer, dir.), Oxford, Oxford University Press, The New European Series, 2005.
- L'Europe des Vingt-Cinq. 25 cartes pour un jeu complexe, (avec Jacques Rupnik), Paris, Autrement, 2005.
- L'Intégration européenne. Entre émergence institutionnelle et recomposition de l'État, (avec Y. Surel, dir.), Paris, Presses de Sciences Po, 2004.
- La Politique européenne de la pêche : vers un développement durable ? (avec Catherine Flaesch-Mougin, Danielle Charles-Le Bihan, dir.), préface de Louis Le Pensec, Rennes, Université de Rennes I, Ed. Apogée, 2003.
- L'Europe bleue, Paris, Presses de Sciences Po, 2001 (traduction anglaise Manchester University Press, 2004).
- Les Institutions de l'Union européenne (avec Y. Doutriaux), Paris, La Documentation Française (collection réflexe Europe), 1995, 179 p. (7^{e} édition remise à jour en 2008, 184 p.).
- Quelle Union pour quelle Europe ? (avec F. de La Serre, dir.), Bruxelles, Complexe, 1998.
- Les Paradoxes des régions en Europe, (avec P. Le Galès, dir.), Paris, La Découverte, 1997 (Version anglaise par Routledge, 1998, Londres).
- L'Union européenne : ouverture à l'Est ? (avec F. de La Serre et J. Rupnik), Paris, Presses Universitaires de France (Coll. Politique d'aujourd'hui), 1994.
- Paris-Bruxelles : comment se fait la politique européenne de la France, Paris, Presses de la FNSP, 1993.
- The State of the European Community. Policies, Institutions and Debates in the Transition Years (avec L. Hurwitz, dir.), Londres/Boulder, Longman/Lynne Rienner, 1991.
