= Institute of Public Affairs (Poland) =

Polish think tank

- Instytut Spraw Publicznych
- Formation: 1995
- Type: Think tank
- Legal status: Public benefit organization
- Purpose: Public policy research and advocacy
- Headquarters: Warsaw
- Location: Poland
- President: Jacek Kucharczyk
- Key people: Lena Kolarska-Bobińska (Former President)
- Award: Institution of the Year 2001 (Pro Publico Bono Foundation)
- Website: www.isp.org.pl/en

Institute of Public Affairs (IPA, Instytut Spraw Publicznych) is an independent, non-partisan public policy think tank in Poland. The IPA was established in 1995 to support modernization reforms and to provide a forum for informed debate on social and political issues. It is a Public Benefit Organization as defined by Polish law.

== Staff ==
Jacek Kucharczyk has been the president of the IPA executive board since 2009; previously he was the Institute's director for programming. Previously, Lena Kolarska-Bobińska served as president of the executive board and director of the Institute from 1997 to 2009.

== Achievements ==
In November 2001, the institute was awarded a special prize and the title of "The Institution of the Year 2001" by the Pro Publico Bono Foundation.

Wide international echo was gathered by the two IPA's publications: "The second wave of Polish reforms" and "Four Reforms — from the concept to the realisation". In the special survey about Poland in The Economist these two were mentioned as one of three major sources of information (in addition to OECD reports and Prof. Norman Davies' book).

IPA was one of the most active non-government organizations in preparations to the accessing referendum and the referendum campaign. Its concept of two-day voting paved the way for the constitutional 50% voter turnout.

== Activity ==
The Institute of Public Affairs conducts research as well as societal analysis and presents policy recommendations.

IPA has prepared reform proposals for the key areas in society and politics. The Institute has a network of associates, which consists of scholars from different academic institutions as well as numerous social and political actors. The IPA publishes the results of its activities in the form of books and policy papers. It also organizes seminars, conferences and lectures. Its publications are distributed to members of parliament, government officials, the media and non-governmental organizations.

== Aims ==
The Institute of Public Affairs aims to:

- implement projects significant for the public domain
- initiate public debates
- identify potential threats to the social fabric and anticipate future problems
- offer new ideas for policies aimed at solving existing and future problems
- act as a bridge between academia, the world of politics, the media and NGOs

== Affiliations ==
Institute of Public Affairs is a member of many networks and associations uniting non-government organizations e.g. PASOS, EPIN, EuroMeSCo network, NDRI and Abroad Group.
