= Barbara Kudrycka =

Polish politician (born 1956)

Professor Barbara Kudrycka
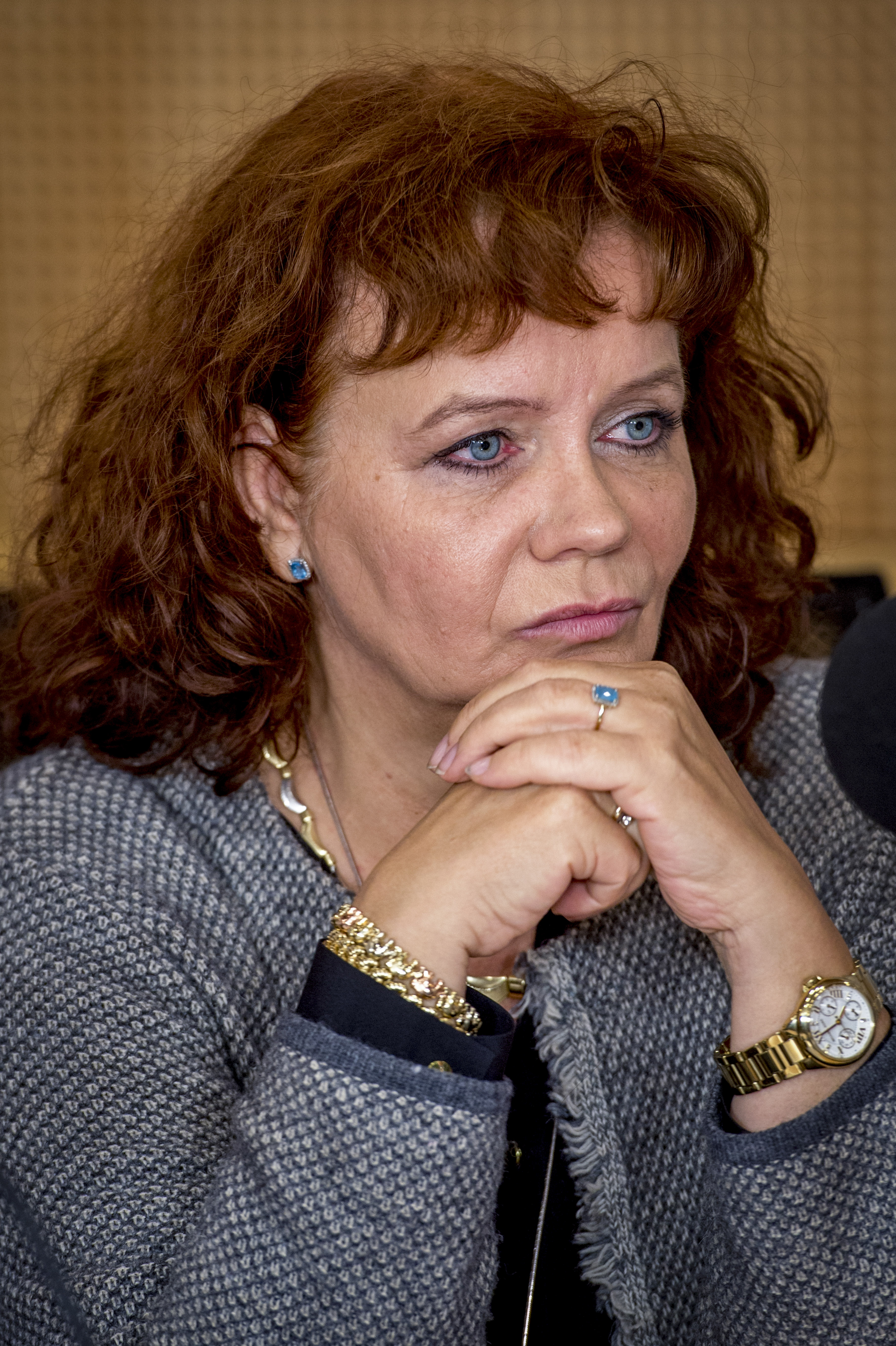

Member of the European Parliament
- In office 1 July 2014 – 1 July 2019
- In office 20 July 2004 – 15 November 2007

Minister of Science and Higher Education
- In office 16 November 2007 – 27 November 2013
- Preceded by: Michał Seweryński
- Succeeded by: vacant

Member of Sejm
- In office 7 November 2011 – 2014

Personal details
- Born: 22 January 1956 (age 70) Kolno, Poland
- Party: Polish: Civic Platform; EU: European People's Party (EPP)
- Spouse: Leszek Kudrycki
- Children: Karolina; Zuzanna
- Education: University of Warsaw

Barbara Kudrycka [barˈbara kudˈrɨt͡ska] (born 22 January 1956, in Kolno) is a professor of administrative law and public administration science and a Polish politician who was the Minister of Science and Higher Education in the cabinet of Donald Tusk from 2007 to 2013.

== Education and early career ==
In 1978 Kudrycka graduated with a degree in law from the University of Warsaw. From 1978 to 1981 she was a member of the Polish United Workers' Party. In 1980 she joined the Solidarity trade union. In 1985 she received a doctoral degree in law and in 1995 became an assistant professor at the Department of Law and Administration at the University of Warsaw.

From March 1998 through August 2007, for three consecutive terms, she was the rector of the Białystok School, and she later became the president.

Since October 2003 she has been the chair of administrative law at the Law Department of the University of Białystok.

== Political career ==
=== Member of the European Parliament, 2004–2007 ===
Since 2004 Kudrycka has been an active member of the Civic Platform.

From 2004 through 2007, Kudrycka was a Member of the European Parliament. She sat on the Committee on Civil Liberties, Justice and Home Affairs. In this capacity, she drafted the parliament's 2006 report on the European Return Fund for the 2007-13 period. She was a substitute for the Committee on Legal Affairs and a member of the parliament's delegation for relations with Belarus. Between 2006 and 2007, she also served on the Temporary Committee on the alleged use of European countries by the CIA for the transport and illegal detention of prisoners. Following her appointment to the Polish government in 2007, she was succeeded by Krzysztof Hołowczyc.

=== Minister of Science and Higher Education, 2007–2013 ===
From 2007 to 2013, Kudrycka served as Minister of Science and Higher Education in the government of Donald Tusk. During her time in office, she formed a working group with her counterparts from the Czech Republic, Hungary and Slovakia to share the best of individual changes in education reform being made in each country. In a 2013 cabinet reshuffle, she was replaced by Lena Kolarska-Bobinska, another former MEP.

=== Member of the European Parliament, 2014–2019 ===
Kudrycka again became a Member of the European Parliament following the 2014 European elections. During her time in parliament, she served as vice-chairwoman of the Committee on Civil Liberties, Justice and Home Affairs, under the leadership of chairman Claude Moraes. In addition to her committee assignments, she was a member of the parliament's delegation for relations with Japan.

Kudrycka was also a member of the European Parliament Intergroup on Creative Industries and of the European Parliament Intergroup on Integrity (Transparency, Anti-Corruption and Organized Crime).

== Other activities ==
- Transparency International Polska, Member

== Political positions ==
In November 2017, Kudrycka joined a parliamentary majority by voting in favor of a resolution invoking Article 7 of the Treaty on European Union, thereby potentially stripping Poland of voting rights in the EU for violating the common values of the bloc, including the rule of law. Shortly after, her political opponents had pictures of Kudrycka and five other Polish politicians strung from a makeshift gallows in a public square in Katowice.

== Personal life ==
Kudrycka is married, with two children.
