= Lena Kolarska-Bobińska =

Polish sociologist and politician (born 1947)

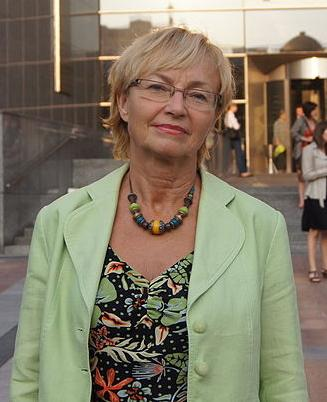

Minister of Science and Higher Education
- In office 3 December 2013 – 16 November 2015
- Prime Minister: Donald Tusk; Ewa Kopacz
- Preceded by: Barbara Kudrycka
- Succeeded by: Jarosław Gowin

Personal details
- Born: 3 December 1947 (age 78) Prague, Czechoslovakia (now Czech Republic)
- Party: Civic Platform
- Education: University of Warsaw; Polish Academy of Sciences

Lena Barbara Kolarska-Bobińska (born 3 December 1947) is a Polish sociologist, academic and politician who served as the Polish Minister of Science and Higher Education from 2013 to 2015.

In order to take the appointment, Kolarska-Bobińska resigned as a Member of the European Parliament (MEP), where she represented the Lublin region from the Civic Platform Party list from 2009.

== Early life and education ==
Kolarska-Bobińska was born in Prague. She is a graduate of the Sociology Department of the University of Warsaw, as well as a post-doctoral fellow at Stanford University and the Business School of Carnegie Mellon University. She also holds a Doctorate (dr. hab.) (1974) and the title of Professor from the Institute of Philosophy and Sociology, Polish Academy of Sciences.

== Career ==
At the Polish Academy of Sciences, Kolarska-Bobińska was head of the Department of Economics and Politics until 1991. From 1991 to 1997 she was director of CBOS, Poland's largest public opinion research centre. From 1997 until July 2009, she served as director of the Institute of Public Affairs, Poland, an independent, non-partisan public policy think tank, stepping down upon her election to the European Parliament.

In the European Parliament, Kolarska-Bobińska served on the Committee on Industry, Research and Energy and the Committee on Petitions. In addition to her committee assignments, she was part of the parliament's delegation for relations with India.

Kolarska-Bobińska has written over 300 books and articles. She has been a lecturer at universities in Poland and abroad. She often comments on political and social developments for Polish and international media. She is a regular columnist for the Polish newspaper "Gazeta Wyborcza" and was until 2009, a regular columnist for the French journal Les Échos.

Kolarska-Bobińska is a member of many Polish and international associations and advisory boards. She was a member of the Economic Council of President Lech Wałęsa (1992–1995), adviser of the Chief Negotiator for Poland's accession to the EU (1998–2001), and a member of President Aleksander Kwaśniewski's Reflection Group (2001–2005). She endorses the idea of a Federal Europe by signing the manifesto of the Spinelli Group.

== Personal life ==
Kolarska-Bobińska is married to Krzysztof Bobiński who is the president of Unia & Polska, a pro-European think-tank in Warsaw and former Warsaw correspondent of the Financial Times (1976–2000). They have two children. She is fluent in Polish, English and Spanish.

== Honours ==
List of National Honours:

- Knight's Cross of the Order of Poland Reborn awarded by the Polish President (1997).
- Officer's Cross of the Order of Poland Reborn awarded by the Polish President (2004).
- European Medal awarded by the European Integration Committee and the Business Centre Club (2004).
- 'Ordre National du Mérite' awarded by the President of the French Republic (2005)

== Publications (selected) ==
- Centralization and Decentralization: Decisions, Power, Myth, Ossolineum, 1984.
- Aspirations, Values and Interests. Poland 1989–94, Instytut Filozofii i Socjologii PAN, 1994.
- Cztery reformy. Od koncepcji do realizacji (red., współautor), ISP, 2000.
- Polacy wobec wielkiej zmiany. Integracja z Unią Europejską (red., współautor), ISP, 2001.
- Obraz Polski i Polaków w Europie (red., współautor), ISP, 2003.
- Przed referendum europejskim, absencja, sprzeciw, poparcie (red., współautor), ISP, 2003.
- Świadomość ekonomiczna społeczeństwa i wizerunek biznesu (red., współautor), ISP, 2004.

Political offices
Preceded by Barbara Kudrycka	Minister of Science and Higher Education; 2013–2015	Succeeded by Jarosław Gowin
