= Institute of International Relations Prague =

Czech public research institution

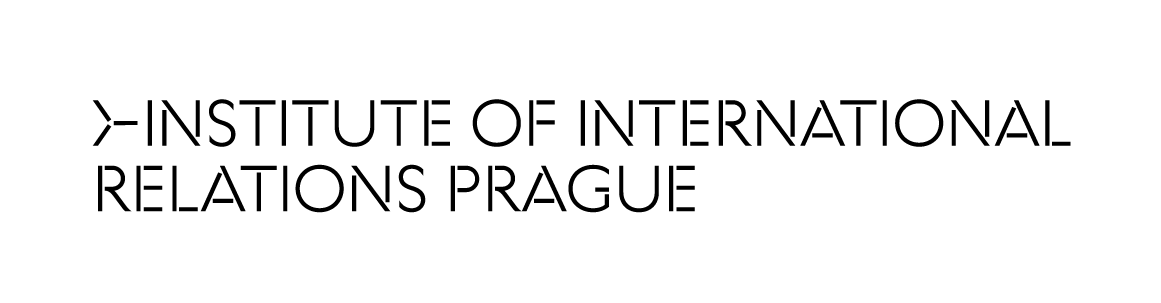

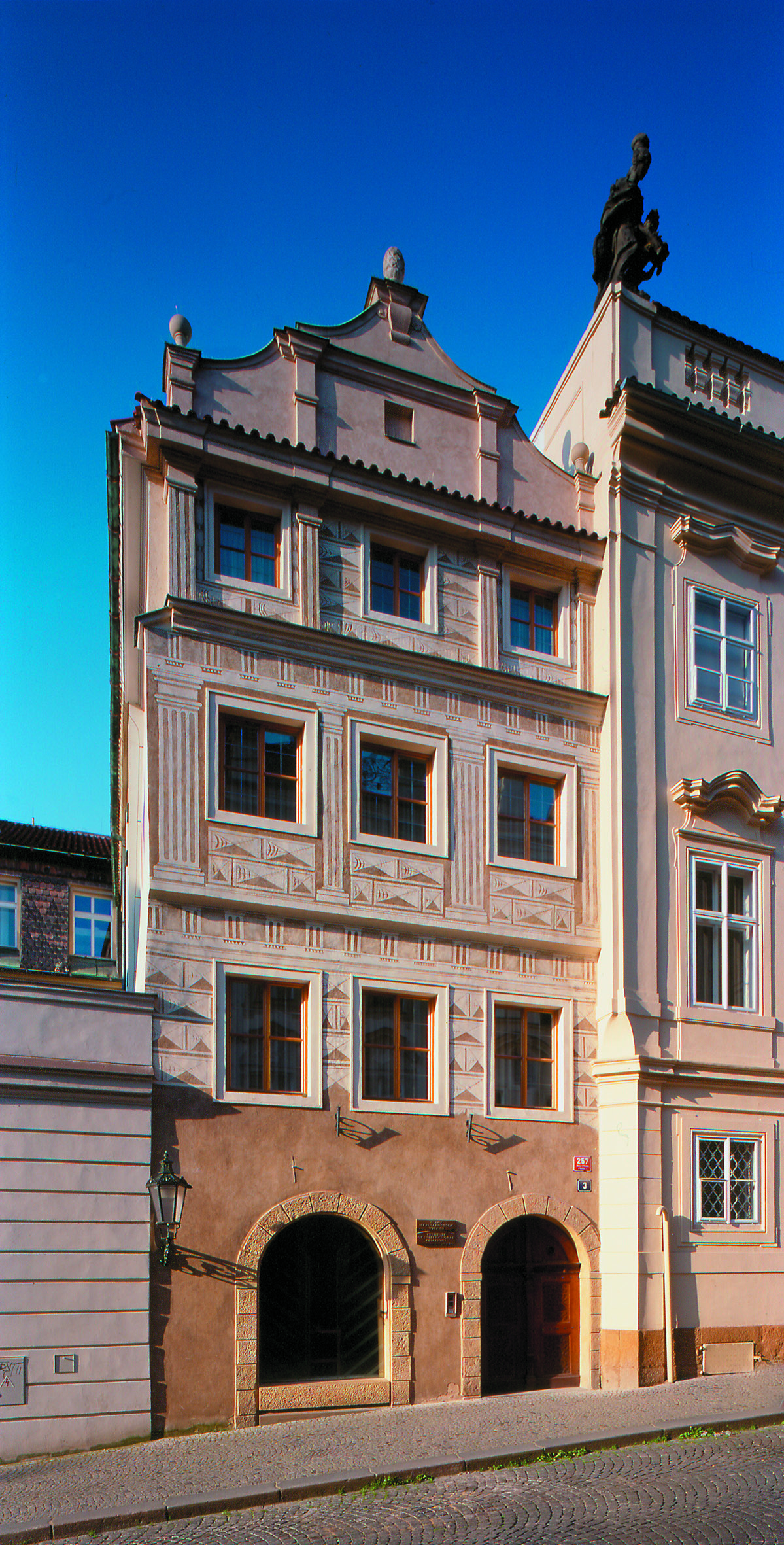
- Native name: Ústav mezinárodních vztahů Praha
- Founded: 1957
- Headquarters: Nerudova 257/3, Prague, 118 00, Czech Republic
- Key people: Mats Braun (director); Jan Kovář (director for research)

The Institute of International Relations Prague (IIR) (Czech: Ústav mezinárodních vztahů Praha) is a public research institution that produces basic and applied scientific research in the field of international relations. Dr. Mats Braun is the director of the IIR. The founder of the IIR is the Ministry of Foreign Affairs of the Czech Republic (MFA). The activities of the IIR are financed from the government budget for science, research, and innovation of the Czech Republic, on the basis of horizontal cooperation with the Ministry of Foreign Affairs of the Czech Republic, from domestic and international projects, and by sales of its publications. The IIR carries out independent research in the public interest.

== History ==
=== Before 1989 ===
The first suggestion for the foundation of an institution that would engage in research of international relations and work under the auspices of the Ministry of Foreign Affairs appeared very soon after the end of WW2. However, the communist revolution of 1948 stopped any plans for such an institution. Therefore, not such institution was founded until 1957 when the IIR predecessor the Institute for International Politics and Economy was established. The Institute had a seat in one of the Petschke villas in the Prague district Bubeneč and it was later moved to the Lobkowitz Palace in Malá Strana (another Prague district) where it resided until 1970.

The Institute for International Politics and Economy (Ústav pro mezinárodní politiku a ekonomii-ÚMPE) became a significant research institution with a great reputation abroad in a very short time. Its high number of foreign connections, a good overview of the international situation and knowledge of the then current scientific research became very problematic for some of the institute's employees at the end of the 1960s. During the Prague Spring some of the employees of the Institute became an active part of the reforming processes which resulted in the cancellation of the ÚMPE and the dismissal of some of its employees at the beginning of the normalization process in 1970. Some of them later emigrated.

As a replacement for the ÚMPE, the Ministry of Foreign Affairs of Czechoslovakia founded the Institute of International Relations in 1970. The historical building the House of the White Horse which stands in Nerudova street in Malá Strana, became its seat. The IIR has had its seat there up until the present. The greater freedom of society in the second half of the 60s was reduced again by gradually increasing ideological pressure, control, and censorship. Despite this, the IIR still tried to stay in touch with other countries including western countries. At this time the IIR had the best equipped and supplied library in the field of international studies in Czechoslovakia however it was not accessible to public and even the scientists had to have special authorization to read many of the (mostly foreign) publications.

=== After 1989 ===
The key changes in the operating of the IIR came after the events of 1989. For the IIR the Velvet Revolution meant not only vast personnel changes but also a journey to becoming a truly independent scientific institution. In the coming years the IIR mainly underwent radical de-ideologization and de-politicization, while there was also a great emphasis on active connections with other countries and making it so that the expertise of the IIR's employees would be as high as possible. Professor Otto Pick, who led the IIR in the years 1994–1998, played a key role in the process of this change.

On the edge of the millennium, the IIR was definitely already a confident, independent and highly professional institution that contributed to the development of international studies. Together with its newly set goals, the IIR continued in its support of the foreign policy of the newly created Czech Republic. For example, the Diplomatic Academy which was founded in 1997 and serves as a preparatory school for diplomatic workers of the Czech Republic, was part of the IIR for almost ten years. The Development Center was also created under the auspices of the IIR in 2001. This center closely cooperated with the Ministry of Foreign Affairs regarding questions of foreign development. In 2007 under the law n. 341/2005 about public research institutions, the IIR was transformed into a public research institution and elements of autonomy were brought into its organization. Simultaneously with this institutional change the Diplomatic Academy was incorporated into the Ministry of Foreign Affairs of the Czech Republic in 2007 and the Development Center was transformed into the independent Czech Development Agency in 2008.

== Current activities ==
=== Research ===
The activities of the IIR consist of its independent research and general popularization and educational activities. The IIR, therefore, creates a unique bond between the academic world, the public and the practice of international politics. The key activity of the IIR is independent research in the field of international relations. The research must follow the priorities defined in the Long Term Plan of the Development of the IIR for the years 2023-2027 and it also follows the Conception of Research of the MoFA for the years 2022–2027. The IIR implements two general kinds of research. The first one is elementary, academic research that has theoretical variety and methodological accuracy and whose ambition is visibility on both the domestic scene and abroad. The second one is practically oriented on applied research that utilizes broad knowledge that comes mostly from the IIR's own research and is based on advanced analytical and research methods. This research is mostly used by the MFA but sometimes it is also used by other public institutions.

The research activities of the IIR are run by the research department. The department is divided into five research centers:

=== The Center for European Politics ===
Investigates processes, institutions, and actors of European politics with a special emphasis on questions of European integration. It deals mostly with processes of integration and differentiation in the European Union as well as the Czech Republic as a part of the EU. Last but not least it examines politics of European states while putting emphasis on their international dimension.

=== The Center for Global Political Economy ===
Studies the mutual entanglement of political and economic power in international relations, the understanding of which is crucial for strategic decision-making of both state and non-state actors in the contemporary globalized world. The research activity pertains to two related levels: international political economy and global justice.

=== The Center for International Law ===
Is focused mainly on analysis of the development of international law in connection with new phenomena and trends of the current world such as globalization, migration or the growing meaning of human rights. The emphasis is put especially on problematics of international organizations, international humanitarian law, international criminal law, international human rights law and usage of power in international relations.

=== The Center for the Study of Global Regions ===
The Center examines the intertwining of political and economic power in international relations, an understanding of which is crucial for strategic decision-making by state and non-state actors in a globalized world. The Center focuses on examining multi-level governance in various global regulatory regimes and changing production and financial relations, including development aid and energy relations.

=== Centre for Governance of Emerging Technologies ===
The center aims to explore the relationship between technology and international politics. Key research topics now include cyber and space security, with an emphasis on planetary defense, asteroid mining, and the use of high-power lasers for a range of space applications from orbital cleanup to breakthrough interstellar projects.

== International cooperation ==
For the purpose of carrying out its research program the IIR internationally networked e.g. in the EU Nonproliferation and Disarmament Consortium, TEPSA (Trans European Policy Studies Association), EPIN (European Policy Institutes Network), the ECPR (European Consortium for Political Research) or EuroMeSCo (Euro-Mediterranean Study Commission). Its foreign partners therefore also include the Norwegian Institute of International Affairs (NUPI), the Korean Institute of Foreign Affairs and International Security (IFANS) and the Austrian Institut für Wissenschaften vom Menschen (IWM). To give an example of the international activities of the IIR we can mention its production of applied research with a regional (especially in projects of the International Visegrad Fund) and a European dimension (e.g. its participation on TEPSA projects for the European Parliament).

== Educational and popularization activities ==
One of the elementary goals of the IIR is broadening of the public knowledge about international studies and cultivation and broadening of the horizons of the public debate about international politics in the Czech Republic. For this purpose, the IIR develops many activities, that should target the public as well as experts.

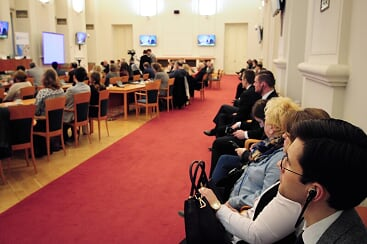
Lecture by the Iraqi Minister of Foreign Affairs

The IIR holds many public events such as panel discussions, lectures or big international conferences that usually focus on relevant international topics and questions that come up in the IIR's own research. The most important conferences are the Prague European Summit (PES), the International Symposium "Czech Foreign Policy" and the Czernin Security Forum which are all held annually. In putting together these conferences the IIR cooperates with important partners such as the MoFA, the Government Office of the Czech Republic, the NATO Public Diplomacy Division, EUROPEUM, PSSI or AMO.

IIR also participates in the education of the students of international studies. It operates as a joint partner in a consortium led by the Faculty of Social Sciences of Charles University, which implements the academic program European Politics and Society (Erasmus Mundus). Last but not least the IIR offers expert internships to Czech and foreign students and university graduates.

Research workers of the IIR regularly appear in Czech and foreign media. These appearances take the form of interviews or commentaries or analyses. These appearances enables them to publish the results of their own research and professionally narrate and comment on international events. Almost all of the outputs produced by the IIR are also published and made available to the broad public via many communication channels but mainly through social media (Facebook, Twitter, Instagram, YouTube).

== Publishing activities ==
The publishing activities of the IIR have a key meaning for its research as well as its popularization and educational activities. The IIR has its own publishing house that deals with the preparation, production, and sales of its periodical and non-periodical publications. The IIR publishes many publications mostly monographies, policy publications and two academic, peer-reviewed periodicals in printed as well as electronic form: the Czech Journal of International Relations and New Perspectives. It also publishes the popularizing magazine International Politics.

=== The Czech Journal of International Relations ===
The tradition of the CJIR goes back to 1966 when the first issue was published as a publication of the ÚMPE. The journal was originally intended as an academic quarterly. Its quality diminished after the normalization, but the fall of the communist regime brought about its radical reform. Gradually it went back to its original concept namely that of a strictly scientific periodical where Czech, as well as foreign experts, can publish the results of their research. Nowadays the CJIR is peer-reviewed journal that is run according to the regular standards of academic publishing (every admitted text must go through a double-blind, anonymous review procedure). The CJIR is a leading Czech platform for publishing of original results of independent research in the field of international relations.

=== New Perspectives ===
The IIR started to publish the journal New Perspectives in 1993. The main goal of this journal was to publish articles in the English language about Central Europe, as this condition would enable it to reach a broader audience. The journal was also valuable for the IIR's library during the post-Velvet Revolution era because it could be exchanged commodity with other research facilities for valuable foreign publications. Since 2002 the journal has its own review process and in 2015 it changed its name to New Perspectives. In the more than 25 years of its existence the journal became a respected, leading academic periodical that deals with interdisciplinary research of Central and East European politics.

=== International Politics ===
The on-line magazine International Politics comes from the long tradition of the printed periodical of the same name, whose first issue was published in 1956 by the Czechoslovak Society for Spreading of Political and Scientific Knowledge (later known as Socialistic Academy). International Politics gained a favorable reputation mainly in the 60s, but its growth was stopped by the normalization and the issue from December 1969 was the last one for a very long time. International Politics was restored as monthly in 1990. In this form, the journal was led by its editor in chief Dobroslav Matejka until 2000. Prof. Otto Pick was also in the editorial council. In 1991 the editorial office of International Politics was moved to the seat of the IIR and since 1993 the magazine has been published by IIR publishing house. Since 2013, however, it is published only as an electronic magazine.

== The Otto Pick Library of International Relations ==
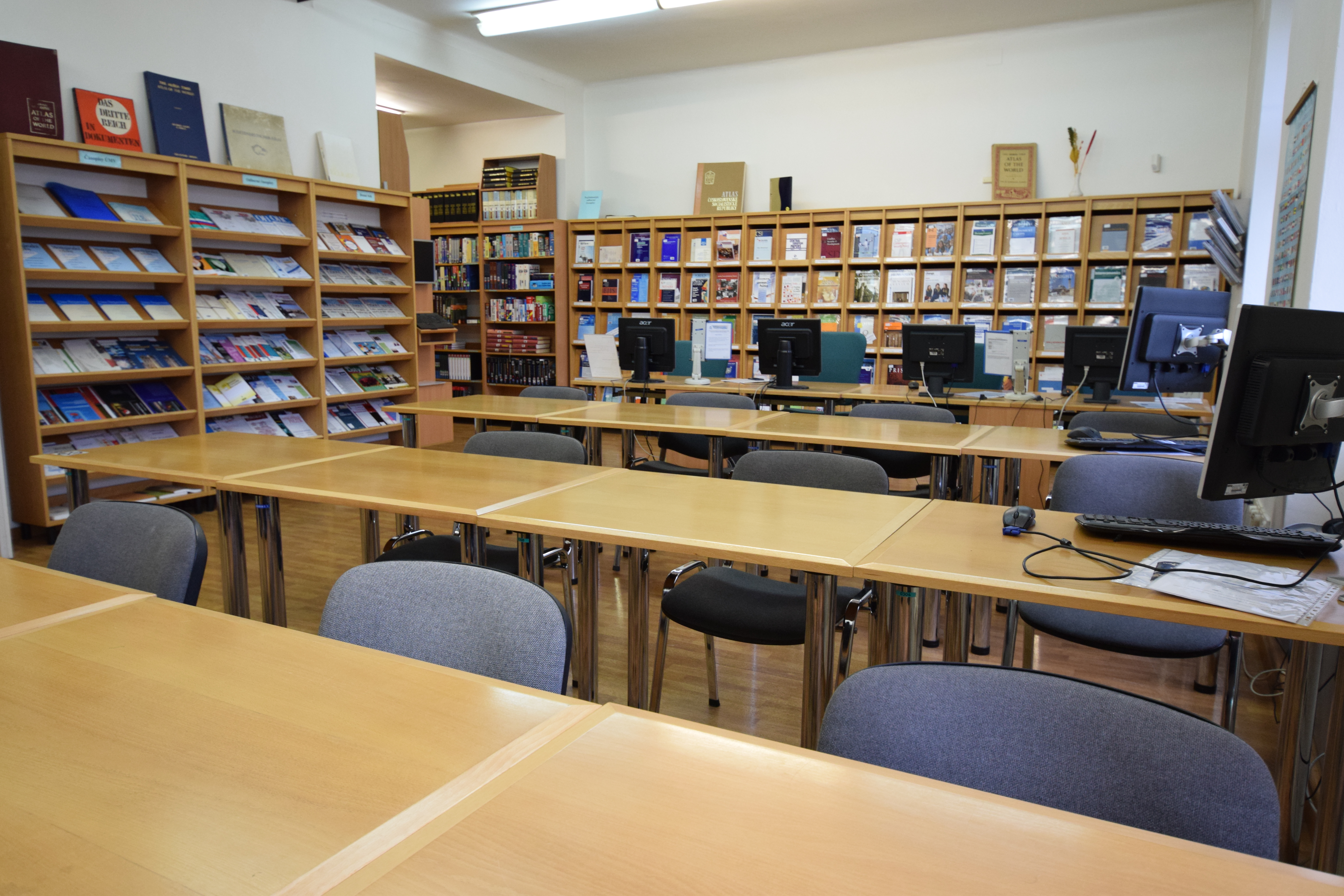
The reading room in the IIR library

The library provides informational, librarian, rental, bibliographical and search services. It cooperates with a number of Czech but mainly with foreign professional libraries and informational institutions. The library offers more than 100,000 volumes of monographs, proceedings, yearbooks, and over 300 journal titles. Full texts of many of the journals are available via paid databases (Newton, PressReader, Taylor and Francis - Social Science & Humanities Library]). The library is a member of the European Information Network on International Relations and Area Studies (EINIRAS) and it also participates in the project Knihovny.cz.

== Organization structure ==
Based on law no. 341/2005 about public research institutions, the IIR has three main organs: the director, the board and the supervisory board. Based on the organization order there is also a commission for working affairs, an ethical commission and several editorial boards. The IIR is led by the director. Currently, this function is held by doc. Mats Braun, Ph.D. As a statutory organ the director decides about every matter pertaining to the IIR, with the exception of the matters that are entrusted by law to the founder (the MoFA) or the other two main organs and ensures that the IIR's accountancy is properly carried out. The IIR board nominates candidates for the position of director of the IIR, determines the directions of the IIR activities; approves the budget, internal regulations, and annual reports; discusses suggestions for the research targets, etc. Members of the board are elected by the IIR researchers from among their own ranks (internal members) and from those of specialists/members of other institutions, governmental bodies which conduct research and the beneficiaries of the IIR research outcomes (external members). The supervisory board of the IIR supervises the activities and economy of the IIR. It has the right to suggest an appeal of the director to the founder of the IIR. It also has the right to express its opinion on the draft budget of the public research institution, on its way of management, on proposals of amendments to the institution's charter, on proposals of a division, integration or unification of the IIR, on research proposals, and on draft annual reports. Members of the supervisory board are appointed and recalled by the founder so that it reasonably represents the founder and, possibly, also the employees of the public research institution.

== See also ==
- Ministry of Foreign Affairs (Czech Republic)
