= Jacques Delors Institute =

French think tank

- Notre Europe - Jacques Delors Institute
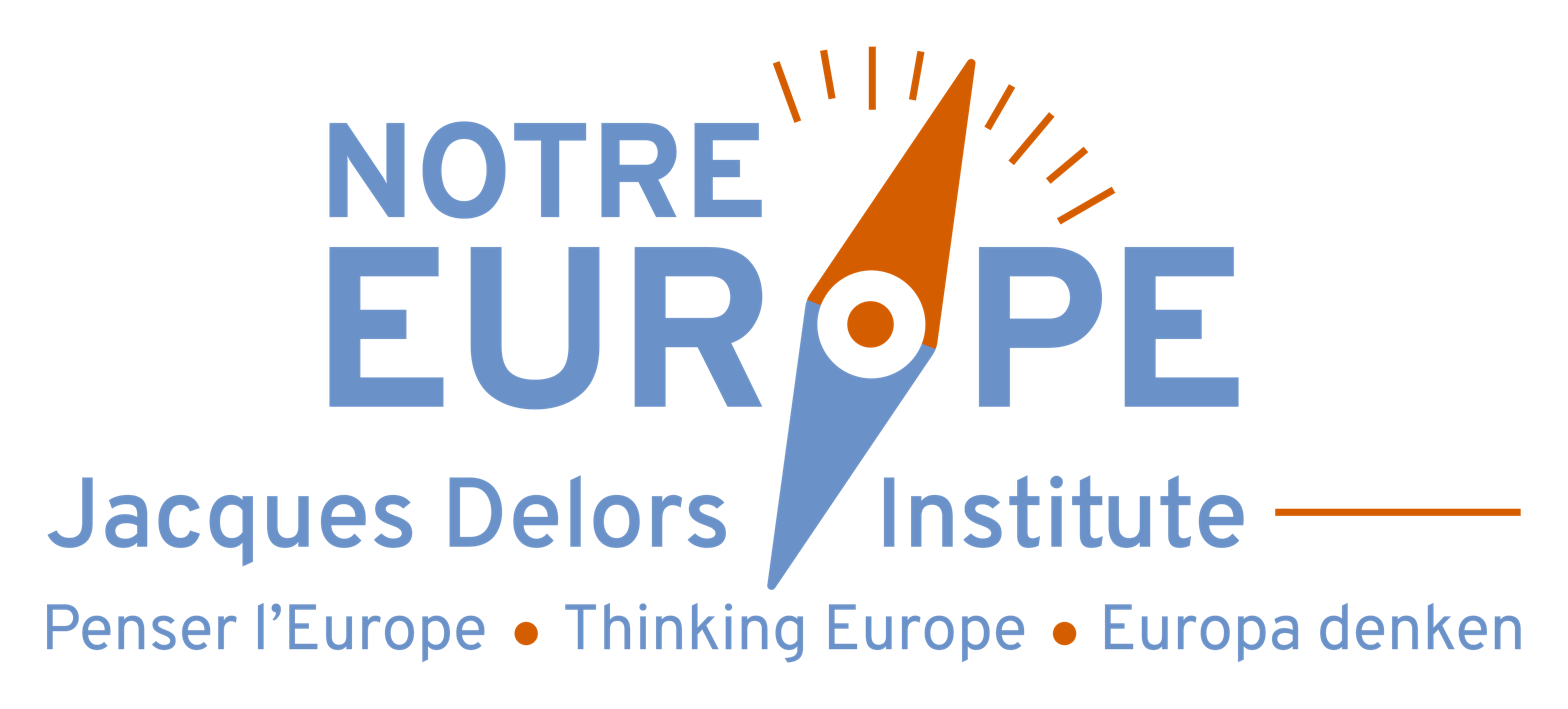
- English logo of the Jacques Delors Institute
- Founder: Jacques Delors
- Type: Think Tank
- Location: 18 rue de Londres, Paris, France
- President: Enrico Letta (since 2016)
- Director: Sylvie Matelly
- Website: institutdelors.eu/en

Notre Europe - Jacques Delors Institute (French: Notre Europe - Institut Jacques Delors), formerly Notre Europe (lit. 'Our Europe'), is an independent think tank based in Paris. Founded in 1996 by Jacques Delors, it aims to "think a united Europe." Enrico Letta currently serves as president of the Jacques Delors Institute, while Sylvie Matelly is its director.

The Institute was ranked 22nd among the 'Top Think Tanks in Western Europe' in the 2019 Global Go To Think Tank Report of the University of Pennsylvania, making it in third place among think tanks based in France.

The Jacques Delors Institute is part of the Jacques Delors Think Tanks Network, which also includes the Jacques Delors Centre in Berlin and Europe Jacques Delors in Brussels.

== Research ==
The Jacques Delors Institute research is focused around four axes:

- "Visions of Europe" (European identity; European institutional reform)
- "European democracy in action" (transnational deliberative democracy; European think tanks)
- "Competition, cooperation, solidarity" (the CAP post-2013; the European budget; a European energy policy)
- "Europe and world governance" (comparative regional integration)

The Institute regularly produces publications, infographics, and freely accessible webinars. Its publications are essentially produced in-house, but outside researchers and academics are also called on. Work is published in French and English, and occasionally German.

Notable debate contributions by Notre Europe include the organisation of Europe's first transnational deliberative poll, Tomorrow's Europe; a study on the poisonous budget rebate debate; an analysis of the 2005 rejection of the European constitutional treaty; an examination of European think tanks; a blueprint for a new "European social contract"; and a proposal to politicise European debate by linking the choice of European Commission president to European Parliament elections.

For the period 2019-2022, the Jacques Delors Institute participated among 15 consortium partners in the Horizon 2020 research project EU IDEA (Integration and Differentiation for Effectiveness and Accountability). Inside the project, it coordinates the Work Package 4, dealing with the Economic and Monetary Union of the European Union and the Single Market.

== Activities ==
The activities of the Institute primarily revolve around the following themes:

- Democracy and citizenship
- Law and institutions.
- Europe in the world.
- Economy and finance.
- Energy and climate.
- Enlargement of the European Union.
- Social Europe.

== Académie Notre Europe ==
The Académie Notre Europe is a training facility affiliated with the Jacques Delors Institute. Its purpose is to provide free training and guidance to a selected group of young people in the field of European issues. Founded in 2017, it welcomes a new class of approximately 100 members from all European Union countries to Paris every year. The working language is French, and the training is entirely free.

== Governance ==
List of the Jacques Delors Institute's presidents
Period	President	Nationality
1996-2004	Jacques Delors	(France) French
2004-2005	Pascal Lamy	(France) French
2006-2010	Tommaso Padoa-Schioppa	(Italy) Italian
2011-2016	António Vitorino	(Portugal) Portuguese
2016-present	Enrico Letta	(Italy) Italian

The institute's main bodies are the Board of Trustees and the Board of Directors. The Members of the Board of Trustees include Jacques Delors, Martine Aubry, Gerhard Cromme, Etienne Davignon, Philippe Lagayette, Pascal Lamy, and António Vitorino.

It is a member of the European Policy Institutes Network (EPIN) and frequently works in partnership with other organisations.

== Financing ==
In 2018, the annual budget of the Jacques Delors Institute stood at 1.39 Million Euros. The biggest individual contributors to the Institute's budget were the European Commission and the French government, making up roughly 50 percent of revenues. Other partners include the companies Macif, Engie, Solvay, Enedis and the Gulbenkian Foundation.

Over the period 2016-2018, project-related contributions to the Institute's budget came, among others, from the European Parliament, the Region Île-de-France, the Caisse des dépôts, France Stratégie the European Climate Foundation and several governments of EU member states.
