= NITROS Project =

European aerospace training program

The NITROS (Network for Innovative Training on ROtorcraft Safety) project is an ongoing project which began in November 2016 consisting of 12 Early-Stage Researchers (ESRs). It is funded through the European Union's Marie Skłodowska-Curie Actions (MSCA) research grant which is an Innovative Training Network (ITN) to support European Joint Doctorates (EJD). The collective aim of this specific MSCA scheme is for fostering new skills by means of excellent initial training of researchers.

NITROS aims to train aerospace engineers in Control Engineering, Computational Fluid Dynamics (CFD), Modeling and Simulation, Structural Dynamics and human perception cognition and action, to address complex solutions for rotorcraft safety. Rotorcraft accident rates remain disproportionately high in comparison with fixed-wing aircraft.

The network is composed of four universities spread over four countries namely: Politecnico di Milano (Italy), Delft University of Technology (Netherlands), University of Liverpool (England) and the University of Glasgow (Scotland). Whilst there are also six international industrial partners involved in helping collaborate: Bristow Helicopters, Civil Aviation Authority, Eurocontrol, Leonardo Helicopter, National Aerospace Laboratory and the Max Planck Institute.

The NITROS project will be presented at the 44th European Rotorcraft Forum in Delft and the subsequent 45th and 46th European Rotorcraft Forums, where the 12 projects will be presented.

Each research project is focused on a problem that affects the safety of the current or innovative rotorcraft configurations.
