= Jacques Delors Think Tanks Network =

Group of think tanks

The Jacques Delors Think Tanks Network is a group of three mutually independent but related think tanks based respectively in Paris, Berlin and Brussels: by chronological order of establishment, the Jacques Delors Institute (JDI, est. 1996 under the name Notre Europe and renamed in 2012), Jacques Delors Centre (JDC, est. 2019); and Europe Jacques Delors (EJD, est. 2020). They self-describe as "three sisters", all named after European statesman Jacques Delors.

== Oveview ==
Both JDC and EJD started as local branches of JDI, opened in 2014 and 2017 respectively, and were subsequently repurposed as autonomous organizations. In the Berlin case this was achieved by merger into the Hertie School.

The JDI Berlin office was originally established at Pariser Platz 6 in central Berlin. It then relocated next to the Hertie School before relocating to Alexanderstrasse 3 in the early 2020s.

== Leadership ==
Pascal Lamy has been coordinator of the Delors Think Tanks Network since its creation.

=== Jacques Delors Institute ===
- Jacques Delors, chairman 1996-2004
- Christine Verger, Secretary-General 1996-1999
- Jean Nestor, Secretary-General 1999-2004
- Pascal Lamy, chairman 2004-2005
- Gaëtane Ricard-Nihoul, Secretary-General 2004-2011
- Tommaso Padoa-Schioppa, chairman 2005-2010
- António Vitorino, chairman 2010-2016
- Yves Bertoncini, director 2011-2017
- Enrico Letta, chairman since 2016
- Sébastien Maillard, director 2017-2023
- Sylvie Matelly, director since 2023

=== Jacques Delors Centre ===
- Henrik Enderlein, co-director 2019-2021
- Markus Jachtenfuchs, co-director 2019-2023
- Anke Hassel, co-director 2021-2022
- Johannes Lindner, co-director 2022-2025
- Thu Nguyen, acting co-director since 2025
- Nils Redeker, acting co-director since 2025

=== Europe Jacques Delors ===
- Geneviève Pons, director since 2020

== See also ==
- Konrad Adenauer Foundation
- Robert Schuman Center for Advanced Studies
- List of think tanks
