= EPIN =

The European Policy Institutes Network (EPIN) is a network of 31 think tanks from most EU member states and beyond. Its main focus is on current EU and European political and policy debates. EPIN aims to contribute to the debate on the future of Europe through up to the minute, expert analysis and commentary and through providing easy access to understanding the different national debates. EPIN is coordinated by the Centre for European Policy Studies in Brussels, Belgium.

== History ==
EPIN is a network of European think tanks and policy institutes with members in most member states and candidate countries of the European Union. It was established in 2002 during the constitutional Convention on the Future of Europe with partial funding under the PRINCE 'Future of Europe' programme of the European Commission. Then, its principal role was to follow the works of the Convention. More than 30 conferences in member states and candidate countries were organised in the following year. Since its founding CEPS has served as the network's coordinator.

With the conclusion of the Convention, the funding ended. Yet, CEPS and other participating institutes decided to keep the network in operation. Since then CEPS provides financial support to the network. EPIN has continued to follow the constitutional process in all its phases: (1) the intergovernmental conference of 2003–2004; (2) the ratification process of the Constitutional Treaty; (3) the period of reflection; and (4) the intergovernmental conference of 2007. EPIN continued to follow (6 ) the ratification process of the Lisbon Treaty and currently entered into the next (6) phase on the implementation of the Treaty.

== Status quo ==
Currently there are 31 EPIN members from 26 countries, also from countries outside of the EU. The 'hard core' work of the network is based on the cooperation of about 15 most active institutes. The member institutes are quite diverse in size and structure, but are all characterised by political independence and the absence of any predetermined point of view or political affiliation.

Since 2005, an EPIN 'Steering Committee' takes the most important decisions. Currently there are seven member institutes: CEPS, DIIS (Denmark), ELCANO (Spain), Notre Europe (France), SIEPS (Sweden), HIIA (Hungary) and Clingendael (Netherlands).

EPIN organises three events in EU per year; one of them takes place in Brussels. The network publishes joint publications on topical issues (e.g. flexible integration, Europe of citizens). EPIN focuses on institutional reform of the Union, but other issues are also addressed. The network follows preparations for the European elections, the EU's communication policy, and the political dynamics after enlargement, as well as EU foreign policy and justice and home affairs.

== Achievements ==
EPIN is a network that offers its member institutes the opportunity to contribute to the 'European added-value' for researchers, decision-makers and citizens. The network provides a platform for researchers and policy analysts to establish personal links, exchange knowledge and collaborate on EU-related issues. Members bring their national perspectives to bear on the issues tackled and through collaboration they contribute to establish a 'European added-value' (e.g. on EU communication, flexible integration). By doing so they strengthen a common European dimension in the national debates on Europe.

Nine EPIN members have been ranked among TOP 50 global think tanks in the report 2008 Global Go To Think Tank by James G. McGann from the University of Pennsylvania. The research covered almost 5,500 think tanks in the world.

== EPIN members ==
EPIN currently has 31 member think tanks and policy institutes:

- Centre for European Policy Studies, Brussels
- Centre for European Reform, London
- Centre for Liberal Strategies, Sofia
- CLINGENDAEL – Netherlands Institute of International Relations, The Hague
- Danish Institute for International Studies, Copenhagen
- demosEUROPA – Centre for European Strategy, Warsaw
- EDAM – Centre for Economic and Foreign Policy Studies, Istanbul
- EGMONT – The Royal Institute for International Relations, Brussels
- Elcano Royal Institute for International and Strategic Studies, Madrid
- ELIAMEP – Hellenic Foundation for European and Foreign Policy, Athens
- Estonian Foreign Policy Institute, Tallinn
- European Institute, Sofia
- European Institute of Romania, Bucharest
- EUROPEUM – Institute for European Policy, Prague
- Finnish Institute of International Affairs, Helsinki
- French Institute of International Relations, Paris/Brussels
- German Council on Foreign Relations, Berlin
- Hungarian Institute of International Affairs, Budapest
- Institute of International and European Affairs, Dublin
- Institute of International Relations Prague
- Institute of Public Affairs, Warsaw
- Istituto Affari Internazionali, Rome
- IPRIS – Portuguese Institute of International Relations and Security, Lisbon
- Notre Europe, Paris
- OIIP – Austrian Institute for International Affairs, Vienna
- PROVIDUS – Centre for Public Policy, Riga
- Slovak Foreign Policy Association, Bratislava
- SIEPS – Swedish Institute for European Policy Studies, Stockholm
- University of Ljubljana – Centre of International Relations, Ljubljana
- University of Nicosia – Cyprus Center for European and International Affairs, Nicosia
- University of Vilnius – Institute of International Relations and Political Sciences, Vilnius
