= Neuschwanstein Castle =

Palace in Bavaria, Germany

- Schloss Neuschwanstein (German)
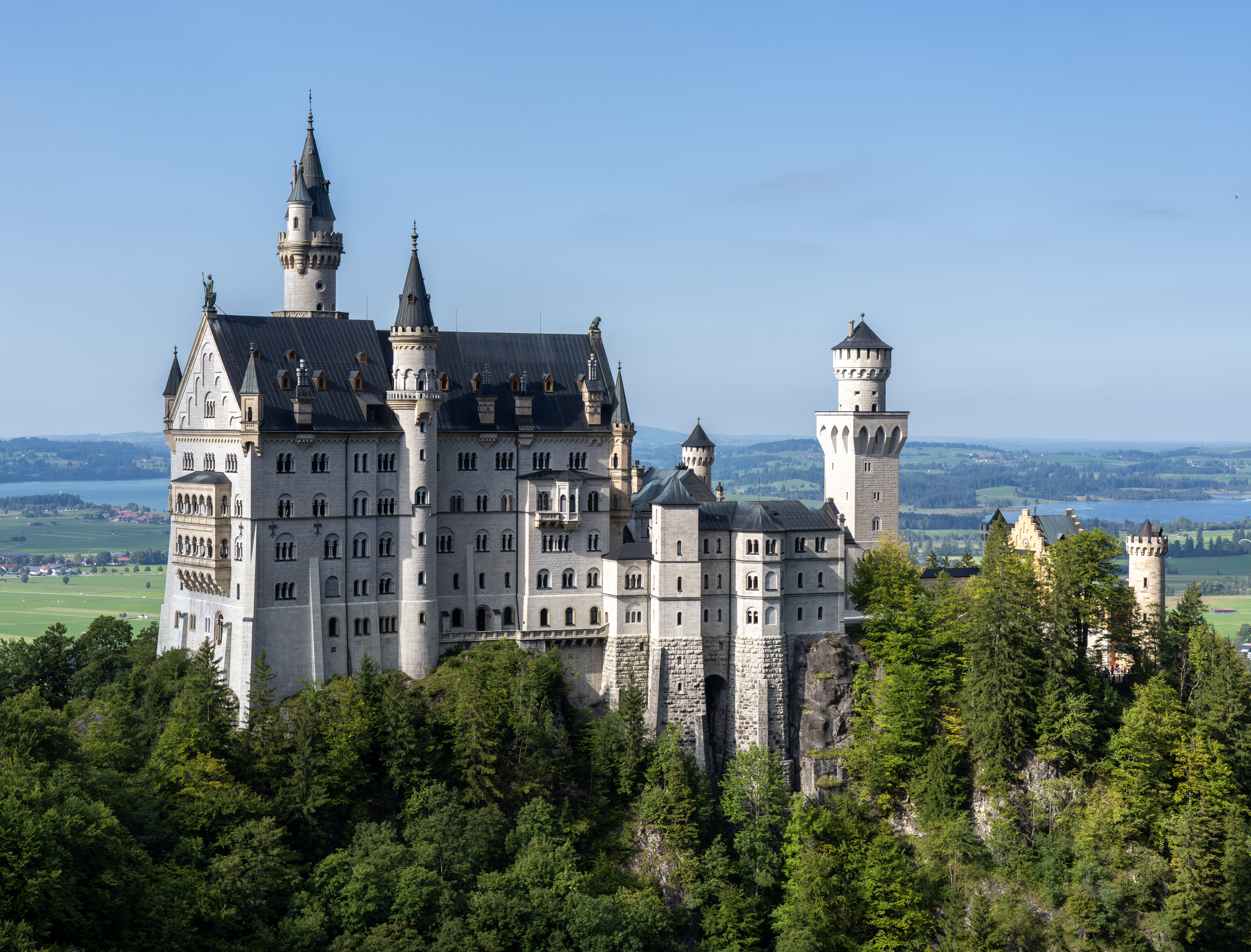
- Neuschwanstein Castle in 2023, looking northeast

- Location within Bavaria Location within Germany

General information
- Architectural style: Romanesque Revival
- Location: Hohenschwangau, Germany
- Coordinates: 47°33′27″N 10°44′58″E
- Construction started: 5 September 1869
- Completed: c. 1886 (opened)
- Owner: Bavarian Palace Department

Design and construction
- Architect: Eduard Riedel
- Civil engineer: Eduard Riedel, Georg von Dollmann, Julius Hofmann
- Other designers: Ludwig II, Christian Jank

Website
- www.neuschwanstein.de

UNESCO World Heritage Site
- Part of: The Palaces of King Ludwig II of Bavaria: Neuschwanstein, Linderhof, Schachen and Herrenchiemsee
- Criteria: Cultural: iv
- Reference: 1726-001
- Inscription: 2025 (47th Session)
- Area: 0.85 ha (2.1 acres)
- Buffer zone: 2,114 ha (5,220 acres)

Neuschwanstein Castle (German: Schloss Neuschwanstein, pronounced [ˈʃlɔs nɔʏˈʃvaːnʃtaɪn]; Southern Bavarian: Schloss Neischwanstoa; lit. 'Newswanstone') is a 19th-century historicist palace on a rugged hill of the foothills of the Alps in the very south of Germany, near the border with Austria. It is located in the Swabia region of Bavaria, in the municipality of Schwangau, above the incorporated village of Hohenschwangau, which is also the location of Hohenschwangau Castle. The closest larger town is Füssen. The castle stands above the narrow gorge of the Pöllat stream, east of the Alpsee and Schwansee lakes, close to the mouth of the Lech into Lake Forggensee. Since 2025, the castle has been part of the UNESCO World Heritage Site "The Palaces of King Ludwig II of Bavaria: Neuschwanstein, Linderhof, Schachen and Herrenchiemsee". According to Guinness World Records, at 65 metres (213 feet), it is the tallest castle in the world.

Despite the main residence of the Bavarian monarchs at the time—the Munich Residenz—being one of the most extensive palace complexes in the world, King Ludwig II of Bavaria felt the need to escape from the constraints he saw himself exposed to in Munich, and commissioned Neuschwanstein Castle on the remote northern edges of the Alps as a retreat but also in honour of composer Richard Wagner, whom he greatly admired. The three-winged complex was built between 1869 and 1892 based on plans by Eduard Riedel in the Neo-Romanesque style. Medieval knights' castles served as their architectural model. The throne room, the bedroom, and the minstrels' hall are particularly noteworthy.

Ludwig II chose to pay for the palace out of his personal fortune and by means of extensive borrowing rather than Bavarian public funds. The castle was intended to serve as a private residence for the king, but he died in 1886, and it was opened to the public shortly after his death. Since then, more than 61 million people have visited Neuschwanstein Castle. More than 1.3 million people visit annually, with as many as 6,000 per day in the summer. The castle is open to the general public through guided tours.

== Location ==
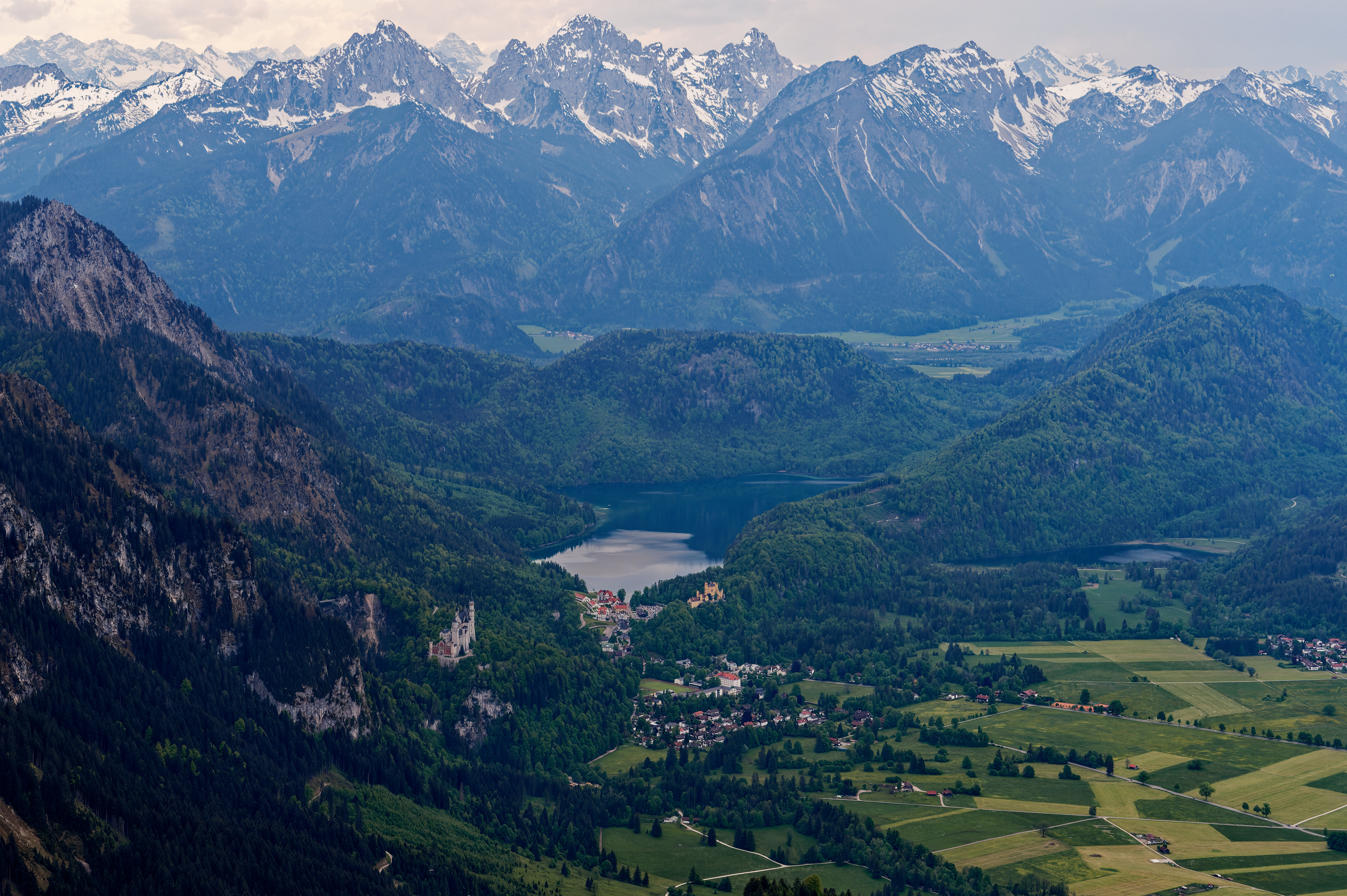
An eastward view over the village of Hohenschwangau and the Alpsee (Alp Lake) towards the Tyrolean Alps, with the two castles of Neuschwanstein (white; left) and Hohenschwangau (yellow; right). Also visible is the smaller Schwansee (Swan Lake), to the right.

The municipality of Schwangau lies at an elevation of 800 m (2,620 ft) at the southwest border of the German state of Bavaria. Its surroundings are characterised by the transition between the Alpine foothills in the south (toward the nearby Austrian border) and a hilly landscape in the north that appears flat by comparison. In the Middle Ages, three castles overlooked the villages. One was called Schwanstein Castle. (Note: Burg Schwanstein literally translates as Swanstone Castle.) In 1832, Ludwig's father, King Maximilian II of Bavaria, bought the ruins to replace them with the comfortable neo-Gothic palace known as Hohenschwangau Castle. Finished in 1837, the palace became his family's summer residence, and his elder son Ludwig (born 1845) spent a large part of his childhood here.

Vorderhohenschwangau Castle and Hinterhohenschwangau Castle sat on a rugged hill overlooking Schwanstein Castle, (Note: Vorderhohenschwangau Castle (German: Burg Vorderhohenschwangau) and Hinterhohenschwangau Castle (German: Burg Hinterhohenschwangau) were collectively referred to as Hohenschwangau Castle (German: Burg Hohenschwangau). Confusingly, the neo-Gothic palace built by Ludwig's father is known in English under the same name; in German, it is called Hohenschwangau Palace (German: Schloß Hohenschwangau). An approximate literal translation of Hohenschwangau is High Swan District, but Gau refers to a large, unforested area. The prefixes Vorder- and Hinter- identify "front" and "back" of the ensemble.) two nearby lakes (Alpsee and Schwansee), and the village. Separated by only a moat, they jointly consisted of a hall, a keep, and a fortified tower house. In the 19th century, only ruins remained of the twin medieval castles; those of Hinterhohenschwangau served as a lookout place known as Sylphenturm.

The ruins above the family palace were known to the crown prince from his excursions. He first sketched one of them in his diary in 1859. When the young king ascended the throne in 1864, the construction of a new palace in place of the two ruined castles became the first in his series of palace building projects. He called the new palace New Hohenschwangau Castle. Only after Ludwig's death was it renamed Neuschwanstein, which confusingly resulted in Hohenschwangau and Schwanstein effectively swapping names: his father's Hohenschwangau Castle replaced the ruins of Schwanstein Castle, and Neuschwanstein Castle replaced the ruins of the two original Hohenschwangau Castles.

== History ==
=== Inspiration and design ===
Neuschwanstein project drawing (Christian Jank 1869)

Neuschwanstein embodies both the contemporaneous architectural fashion known as castle Romanticism (German: Burgenromantik) and King Ludwig II's enthusiasm for the operas of Richard Wagner. In the 19th century, many castles were constructed or reconstructed, often with significant changes, to make them more picturesque. Palace-building projects similar to Neuschwanstein had been undertaken earlier in several of the German states. They included Hohenschwangau Castle, Lichtenstein Castle, Hohenzollern Castle, and numerous buildings on the Rhine, such as Stolzenfels Castle. Marienburg Castle, begun in 1858 for the King of Hanover, was completed in 1867. The more detailed inspiration for the construction of Neuschwanstein came from two journeys that Ludwig took in 1867: one in May to the reconstructed Wartburg near Eisenach, site of the mythical Sängerkrieg and thus setting of Wagner's opera Tannhäuser and the Singers' Contest at Wartburg, and another in July to the Château de Pierrefonds, which Eugène Viollet-le-Duc was transforming from a ruined castle into a historicist palace for Napoleon III. (Note: The journeys took place during the period of the homosexual king's engagement with his cousin Sophie in Bavaria, which was announced in January and dissolved by Ludwig in October.)

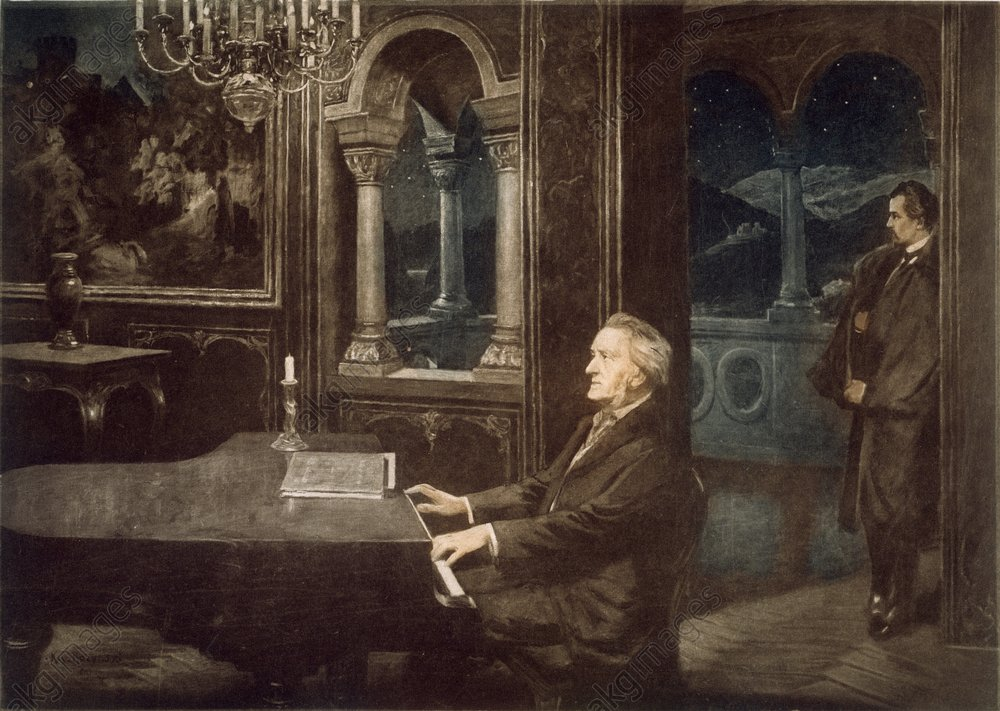
Wagner and Ludwig II (by Kurt von Rozynski, 1890)

Ludwig believed both buildings represented a Romanticist interpretation of the Middle Ages, as well as the musical mythology of his friend Wagner, whose operas Tannhäuser and Lohengrin had made a lasting impression on him. In February 1868, Ludwig's grandfather, King Ludwig I, died, freeing the considerable sums that were previously spent on the abdicated King's appanage. (Note: In the Revolutions of 1848 in the German states and after a scandalous affair with Lola Montez, King Ludwig I of Bavaria had to abdicate in favour of his son, King Maximilian.) This allowed Ludwig II to start the architectural project of building a private refuge in the familiar landscape far from the capital Munich, so that he could live out his idea of the Middle Ages. In a letter to Richard Wagner in May 1868, Ludwig wrote:

It is my intention to rebuild the old castle ruin of Hohenschwangau near the Pöllat Gorge in the authentic style of the old German knights' castles, and I must confess to you that I am looking forward very much to living there one day (in 3 years); ... you know the revered guest I would like to accommodate there; the location is one of the most beautiful to be found, holy and unapproachable, a worthy temple for the divine friend who has brought salvation and true blessing to the world. It will also remind you of "Tannhäuser" (Singers' Hall with a view of the castle in the background), "Lohengrin'" (castle courtyard, open corridor, path to the chapel)

The stage designer drafted the building design Christian Jank and realised it by the architect Eduard Riedel. For technical reasons, the ruined castles could not be integrated into the plan. Initial ideas for the palace drew stylistically on Nuremberg Castle and envisaged a simple building in place of the old Vorderhohenschwangau Castle. Still, they were rejected and replaced by increasingly extensive drafts, culminating in a bigger palace modelled on the Wartburg. The king insisted on a detailed plan and on personal approval of every draft. Ludwig's control went so far that the palace has been regarded as his own creation rather than that of the architects involved. Whereas contemporary architecture critics derided Neuschwanstein, one of the last big palace building projects of the 19th century, as kitsch, Neuschwanstein and Ludwig II's other buildings are now counted among the major works of European historicism. For financial reasons, a project similar to Neuschwanstein—Falkenstein Castle—never got past the planning stages.

The palace can be regarded as typical of 19th-century architecture. The shapes of Romanesque (simple geometric figures such as cuboids and semicircular arches), Gothic (upward-pointing lines, slim towers, delicate embellishments), and Byzantine architecture and art (the Throne Hall décor) were mingled in an eclectic fashion and supplemented with 19th-century technical achievements. The Patrona Bavariae and Saint George on the court face of the Palas (main building) are depicted in the local Lüftlmalerei style, a fresco technique typical for Allgäu farmers' houses. At the same time, the unimplemented drafts for the Knights' House gallery foreshadow elements of Art Nouveau. Characteristic of Neuschwanstein's design are theatre themes: Christian Jank drew on coulisse drafts from his time as a scenic painter. The basic style was first planned to be neo-Gothic, but the palace was primarily built in the Romanesque style in the end. The operatic themes moved gradually from Tannhäuser and Lohengrin to Parsifal.

=== Construction ===
The site of the Castle before its construction began, c. 1860

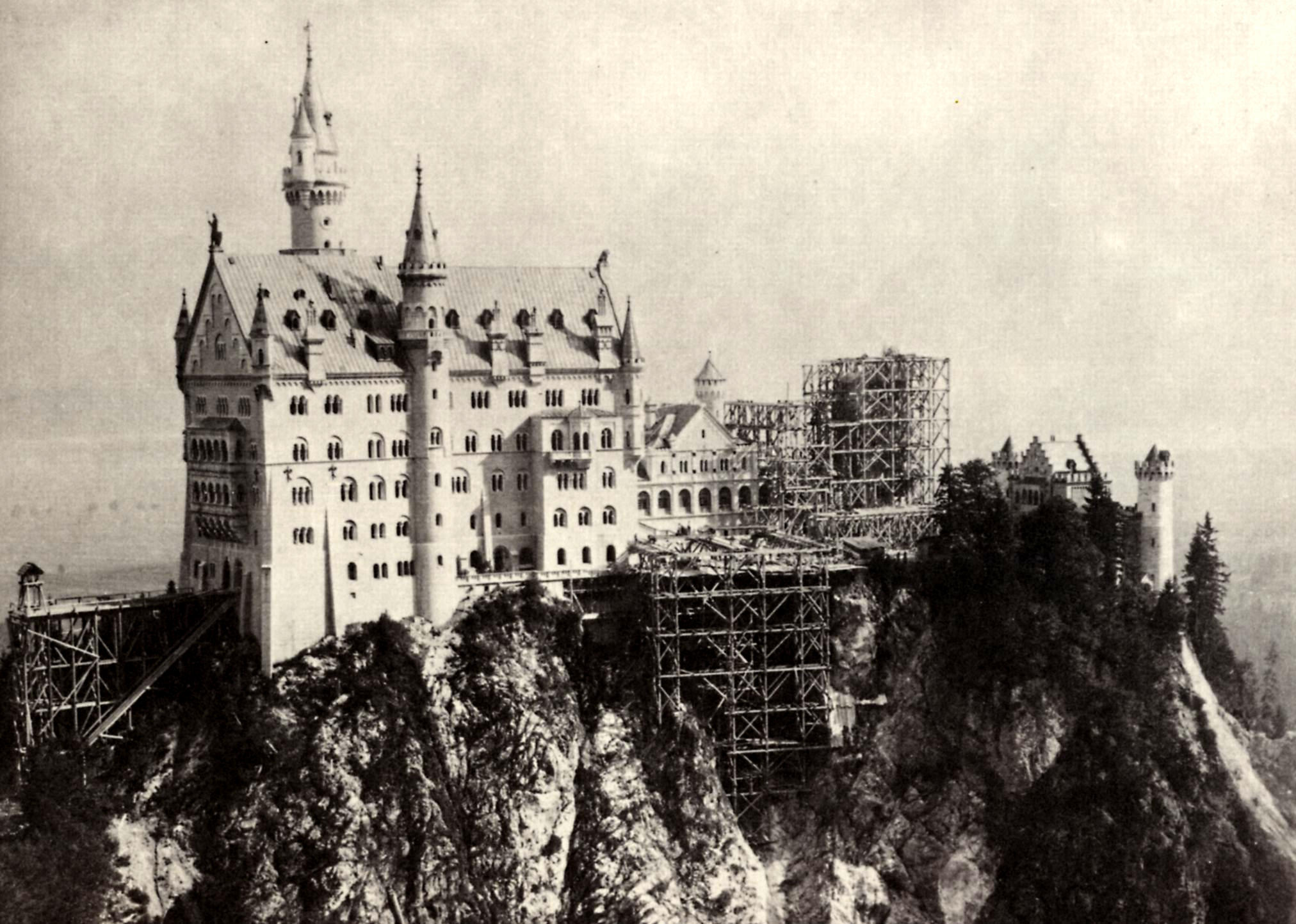
Neuschwanstein under construction: Bower still missing, Rectangular Tower under construction (photograph c. 1882–85)

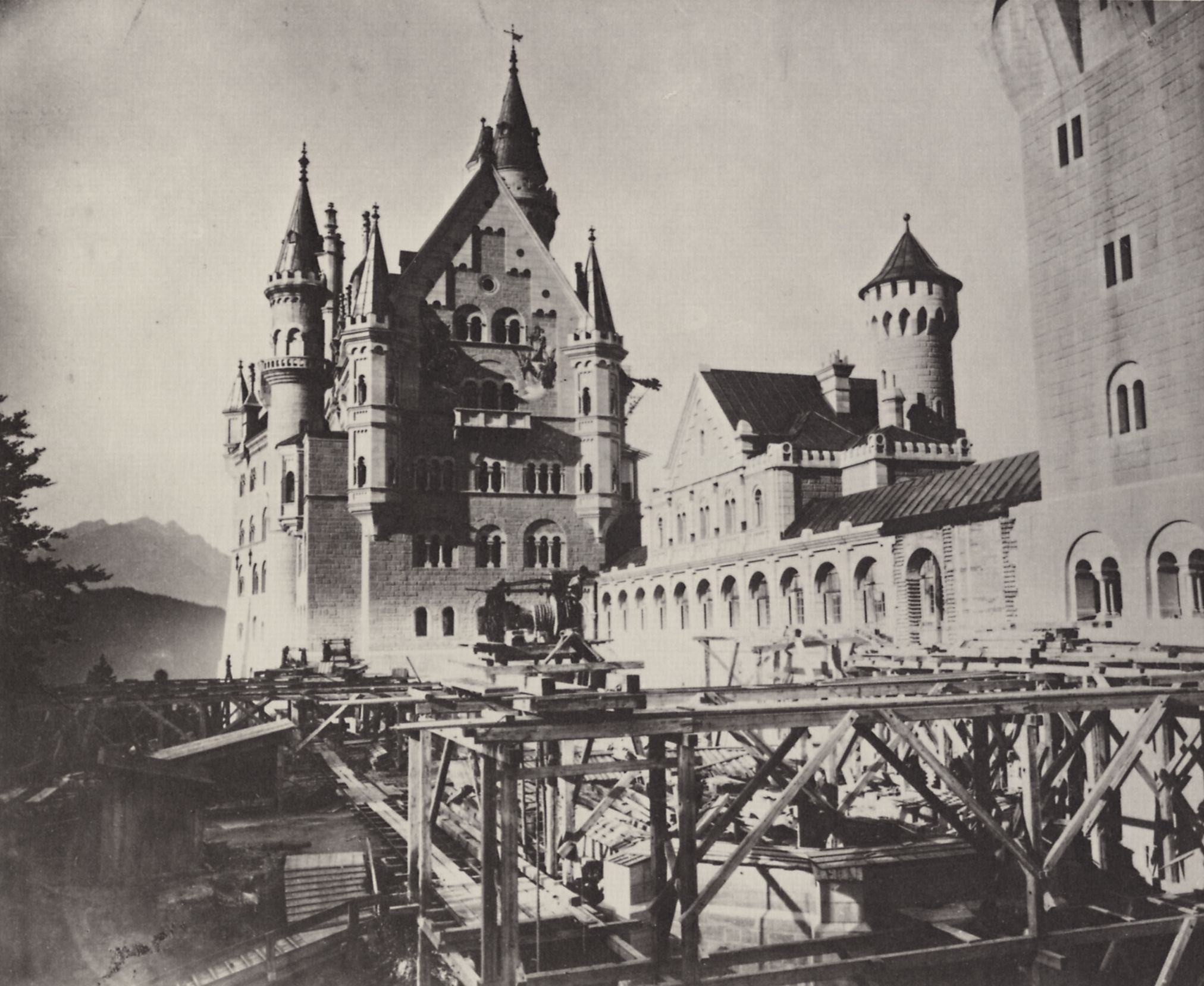
Neuschwanstein under construction: upper courtyard (photograph c. 1886)

In 1868, the ruins of the medieval twin castles were completely demolished; the remains of the old keep were blown up. The foundation stone for the palace was laid on 5 September 1869; in 1872, its cellar was completed, and in 1876, everything up to the first floor, the gatehouse being finished first. At the end of 1882, it was completed and fully furnished, allowing Ludwig to take provisional lodgings there and observe the ongoing construction work. In 1874, management of the civil works passed from Eduard Riedel to Georg von Dollmann. The topping out ceremony for the Palas was in 1880, and in 1884 the King moved in to the new building. In the same year, the direction of the project passed to Julius Hofmann, after Dollmann had fallen from the King's favour. The palace was erected as a conventional brick construction and later encased in various types of rock. The white limestone used for the fronts came from a nearby quarry.

The sandstone bricks for the portals and bay windows came from Schlaitdorf in Württemberg. Marble from Untersberg near Salzburg was used for the windows, the arch ribs, the columns and the capitals. The Throne Hall was a later addition to the plans and required a steel framework. The transport of building materials was facilitated by scaffolding and a steam crane that lifted the material to the construction site. Another crane was used at the construction site. The recently founded Dampfkessel-Revisionsverein (Steam Boiler Inspection Association) regularly inspected both boilers.

For about two decades, the construction site was the principal employer in the region. In 1880, about 200 craftsmen were occupied at the site, not counting suppliers and other persons indirectly involved in the construction. At times when the King insisted on particularly close deadlines and urgent changes, reportedly up to 300 workers per day were active, sometimes working at night by the light of oil lamps. Statistics from the years 1879/1880 support an immense amount of building materials: 465 tonnes (513 short tons) of Salzburg marble, 1,550 t (1,710 short tons) of sandstone, 400,000 bricks, and 2,050 cubic metres (2,680 cu yd) of wood for the scaffolding. In 1870, a society was founded for insuring the workers, for a low monthly fee, augmented by the King. The heirs of construction casualties (30 cases are mentioned in the statistics) received a small pension.

In 1884, the King moved into the (still unfinished) Palas, and in 1885 he invited his mother Marie to Neuschwanstein on the occasion of her 60th birthday. (Note: The former queen resided in Hohenschwangau Castle. The two had a strained relationship, at least in part because Marie disapproved of Wagner.) By 1886, the external structure of the Palas (hall) was mostly finished. In the same year, Ludwig had the first wooden Marienbrücke over the Pöllat Gorge replaced by a steel construction.

Despite its size, Neuschwanstein did not have space for the royal court but contained only the King's private lodging and servants' rooms. The court buildings served decorative rather than residential purposes: The palace was intended to serve King Ludwig II as a kind of inhabitable theatrical setting. As a temple of friendship, it was also dedicated to the life and work of Richard Wagner, who died in 1883 without visiting the building. In the end, Ludwig II lived in the palace for a total of only 172 days.

=== Funding ===
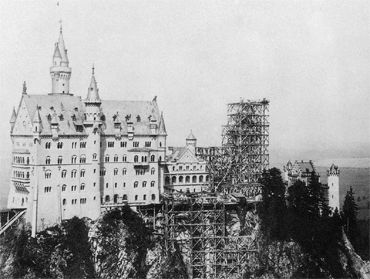
Neuschwanstein in 1886

The King's demands expanded during the construction of Neuschwanstein, and so did the expenses. Drafts and estimated costs were revised repeatedly. Initially, a modest study was planned instead of the great throne hall, and projected guest rooms were struck from the drafts to make place for a Moorish Hall, which could not be realised due to lack of resources. Completion was originally projected for 1872 but repeatedly deferred.

Neuschwanstein, the symbolic medieval knight's castle, was not King Ludwig II's only huge construction project. It was followed by the Rococo style Lustschloss of Linderhof Palace and the Baroque palace of Herrenchiemsee, a monument to the era of absolutism. Linderhof, the smallest of the projects, was finished in 1886, and the other two remain incomplete. All three projects together drained his resources. The King paid for his construction projects by private means and from his civil list income. Contrary to frequent claims, the Bavarian treasury was not directly burdened by his buildings. From 1871, Ludwig had an additional secret income in return for a political favour given to Otto von Bismarck. (Note: In November 1870, Ludwig signed the Kaiserbrief, a letter drafted by Bismarck to the other sovereigns of the German states, asking them to crown the Prussian King Wilhelm I as Kaiser. In return, Ludwig received secret payments out of Bismarck's secret account, the Welfenfonds.)

The construction costs of Neuschwanstein in the King's lifetime amounted to 6.2 million German gold marks (equivalent to €47 million in 2021), almost twice the initial cost estimate of 3.2 million marks. As his private means were insufficient for his increasingly escalating construction projects, the King continuously opened new lines of credit. In 1876, a court counselor was replaced after pointing out the danger of insolvency. By 1883, he already owed 7 million marks, and in spring 1884 and August 1885, debt conversions of 7.5 million marks and 6.5 million marks, respectively, became necessary.

Even after his debts had reached 14 million marks, King Ludwig II insisted on the continuation of his architectural projects; he threatened suicide if his creditors seized his palaces. In early 1886, Ludwig asked his cabinet for a credit of 6 million marks, which was denied. In April, he followed Bismarck's advice to apply for the money to his parliament. In June, the Bavarian government decided to depose the King, who was living at Neuschwanstein at the time. On 9 June, he was incapacitated, and on 10 June, he had the deposition commission arrested in the gatehouse. In expectation of the commission, he alerted the gendarmerie and fire brigades of surrounding places for his protection. A second commission headed by Bernhard von Gudden arrived on the next day. The King was forced to leave the palace that night. Ludwig was put under the supervision of Gudden. On 13 June, both died under mysterious circumstances in the shallow shore water of Lake Starnberg near Berg Castle.

=== Simplified completion ===
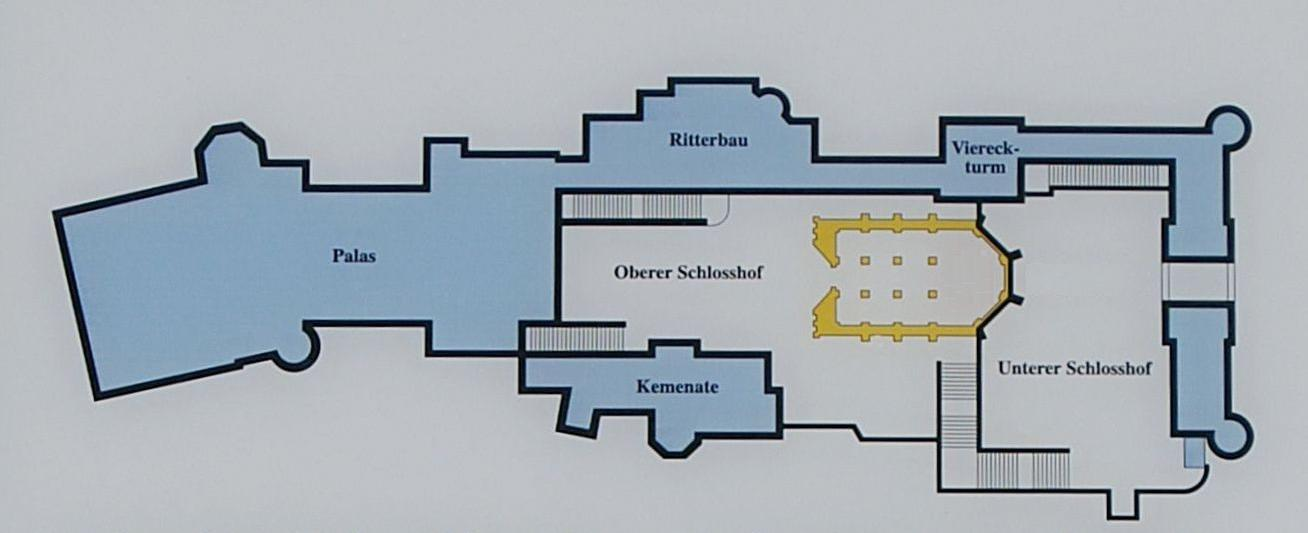
Overview of palace complex; position of the planned chapel marked in yellow

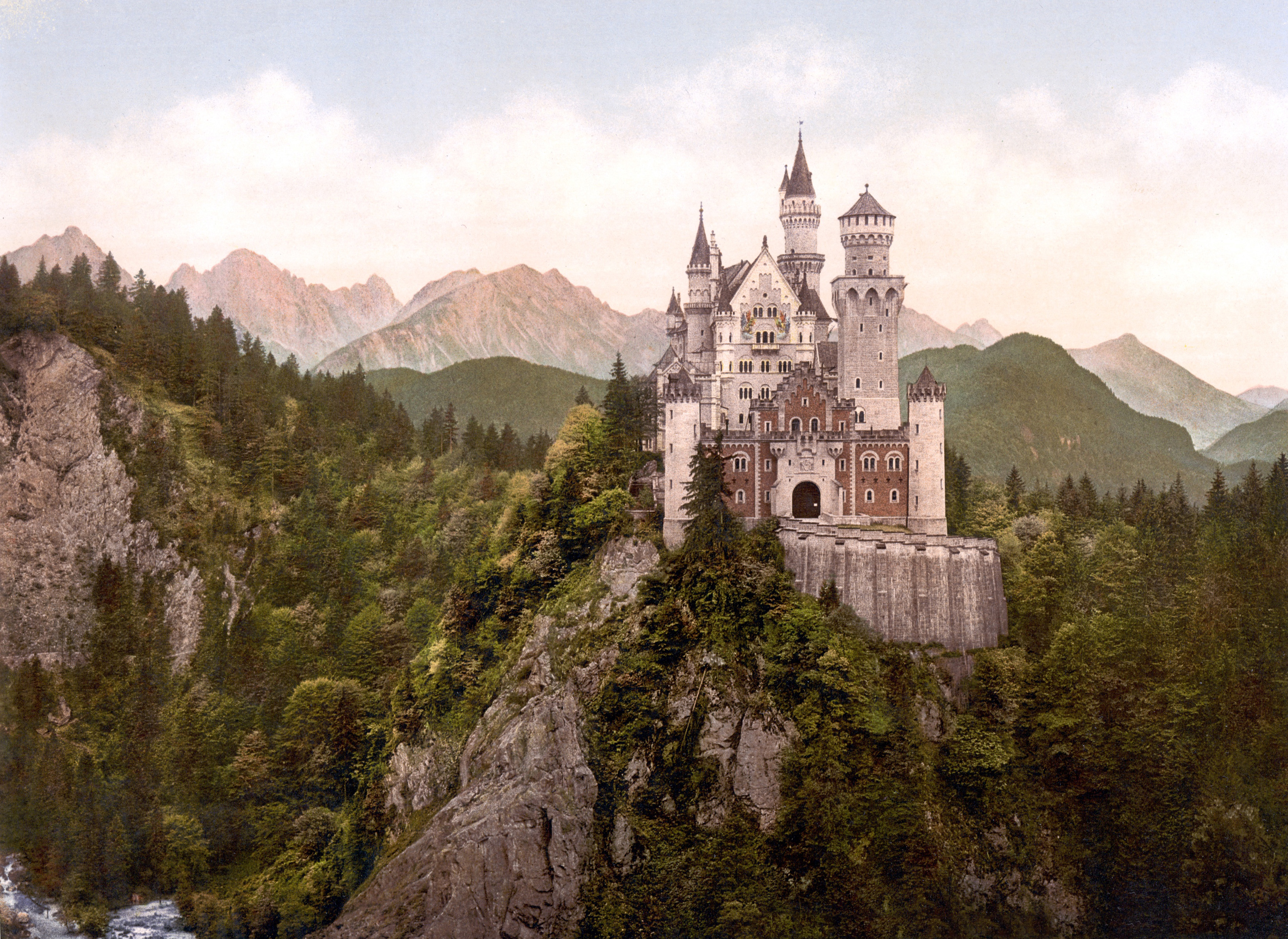
Neuschwanstein front façade and surroundings (photochrom print, c. 1900)

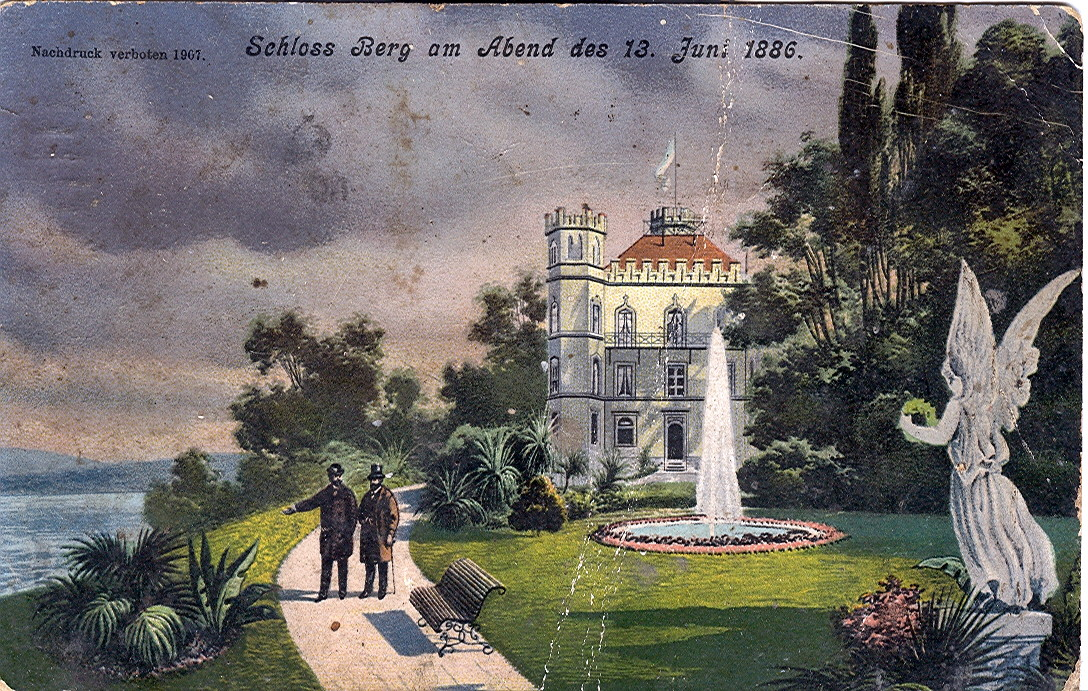
A 1901 postcard of Berg Castle

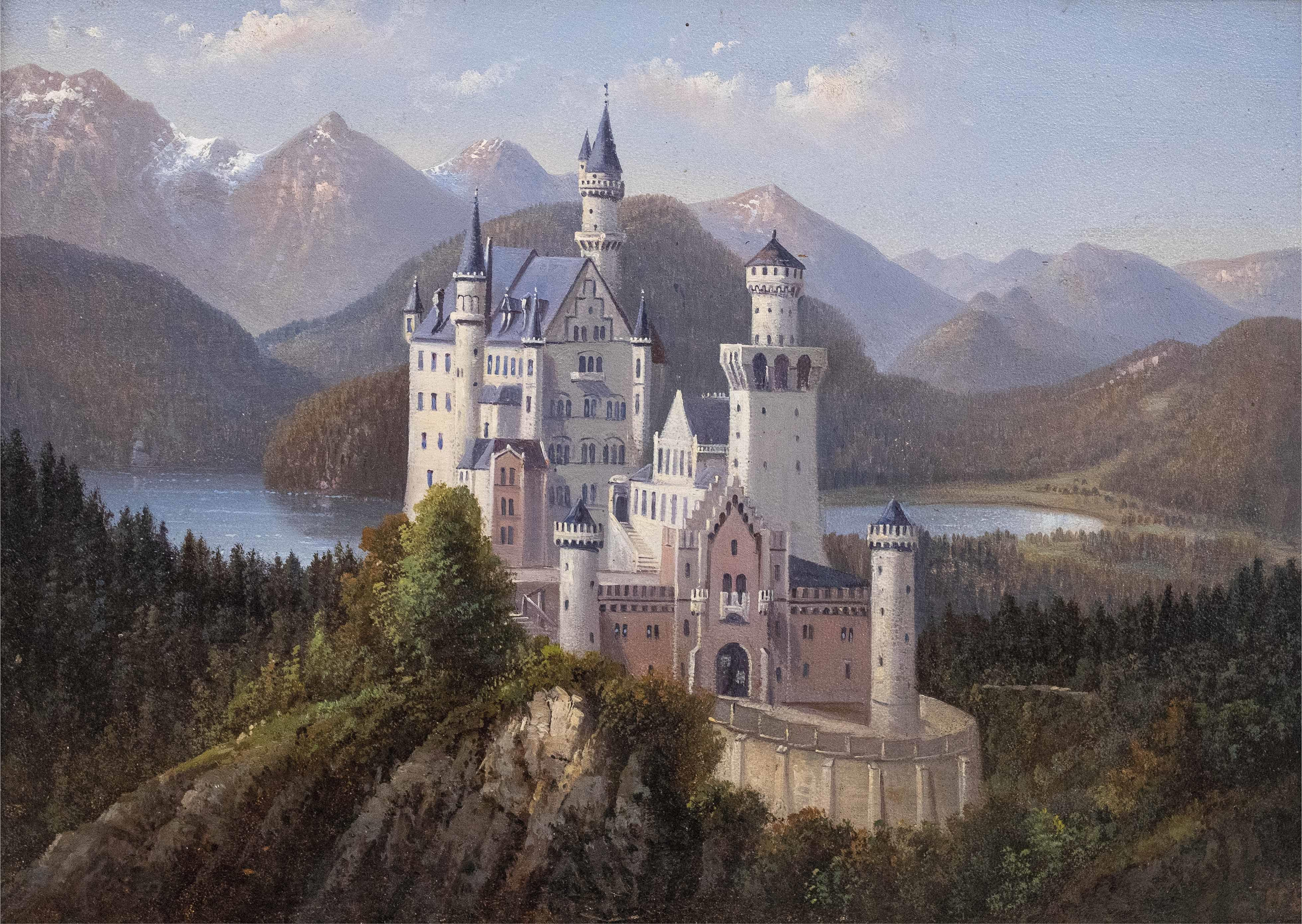
A painting of the castle by Hubert Sattler, before 1904

At the time of King Ludwig's death, the palace was far from complete. The external structures of the Gatehouse and the Palas were mostly finished, but the Rectangular Tower was still scaffolded. Work on the Bower had not started, but was completed in a simplified form by 1892 without the planned figures of the female saints. The Knights' House was also simplified. In King Ludwig's plans, the columns in the Knights' House gallery were held as tree trunks and the capitals as the corresponding crowns. Only the foundations existed for the core piece of the palace complex: a keep of 90 metres (300 ft) height planned in the upper courtyard, resting on a three-nave chapel. This was not realised, and a connection wing between the Gatehouse and the Bower saw the same fate. Plans for a castle garden with terraces and a fountain west of the Palas were also abandoned after the King's death.

The interior of the royal living space in the palace was mostly completed in 1886; the lobbies and corridors were painted in a simpler style by 1888. The Moorish Hall, which was desired by the King and planned below the Throne Hall, was not realised any more than the Knights' Bath, which was modelled after the Knights' Bath in the Wartburg and was intended to render homage to the knights' cult as a medieval baptism bath. A Bride Chamber in the Bower (after a location in Lohengrin), guest rooms in the first and second floors of the Palas, and a great banquet hall were further abandoned projects. In fact, a complete development of Neuschwanstein had never even been planned, and at the time of the King's death, there was no utilization concept for numerous rooms.

The King never intended to make the palace accessible to the public. No more than six weeks after the King's death, the Prince-Regent Luitpold ordered the palace opened to paying visitors. The administrators of King Ludwig's estate managed to balance the construction debts by 1899. From then until World War I, Neuschwanstein was a stable and lucrative source of revenue for the House of Wittelsbach. King Ludwig's castles were probably the single largest income source earned by the Bavarian royal family in the last years prior to 1914. To guarantee a smooth course of visits, some rooms and the court buildings were finished first. Initially, the visitors were allowed to move freely in the palace, causing the furniture to wear quickly.

When Bavaria became a republic in 1918, the government socialised the civil list. The resulting dispute with the House of Wittelsbach led to a split in 1923: King Ludwig's palaces, including Neuschwanstein, fell to the state and are now managed by the Bavarian Palace Department, a division of the Bavarian finance ministry. Nearby Hohenschwangau Castle fell to the Wittelsbach Compensation Fund (Wittelsbacher Ausgleichsfonds), whose revenues go to the House of Wittelsbach. The visitor numbers continued to rise, reaching 200,000 in 1939.

=== World War II ===
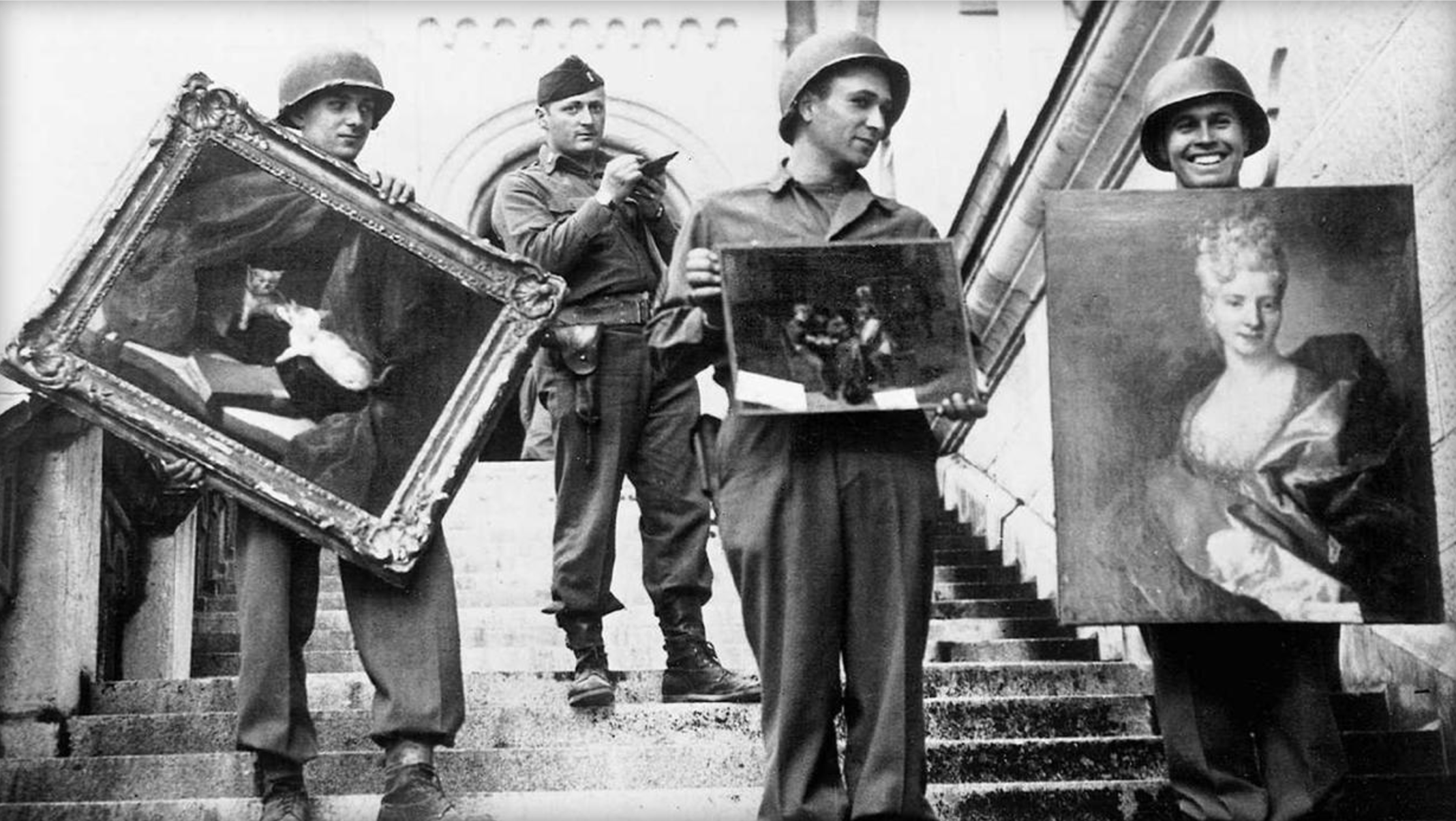
Monuments Men recovering stolen art from the castle, 1945

Due to its secluded and strategically unimportant location, the palace survived the destruction of the two World Wars. Until 1944, it served as a depot for Nazi plunder that was taken from France by the Reichsleiter Rosenberg Institute for the Occupied Territories (Einsatzstab Reichsleiter Rosenberg für die besetzten Gebiete), a suborganisation of the Nazi Party. The castle was used to catalogue the works of art. After World War II, 39 photo albums were found in the palace documenting the scale of the art seizures. The albums are now stored in the United States National Archives.

In April 1945, the SS considered blowing up the palace to prevent the building and the artwork it contained from falling to the enemy. The plan was not realised by the SS-Gruppenführer who had been assigned the task. At the end of the war, the palace was surrendered undamaged to representatives of the Allied forces. The Allied occupation authorities eventually returned the palace to the reconstituted Bavarian state government. Thereafter, the Bavarian archives used some of the rooms as a provisional store for salvaged archival material, as its premises in Munich had been bombed.

== Architecture ==
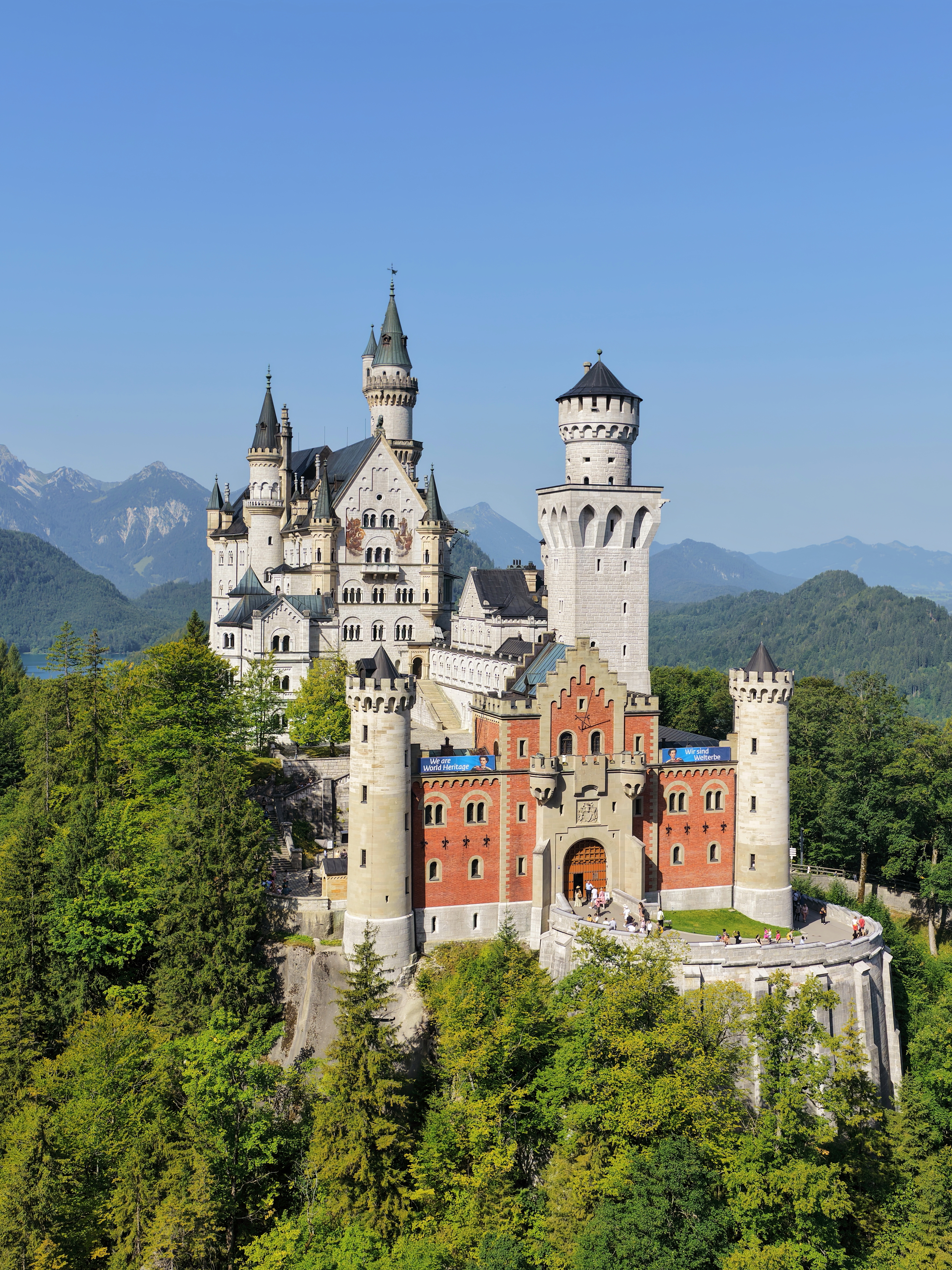
East view of Neuschwanstein Castle

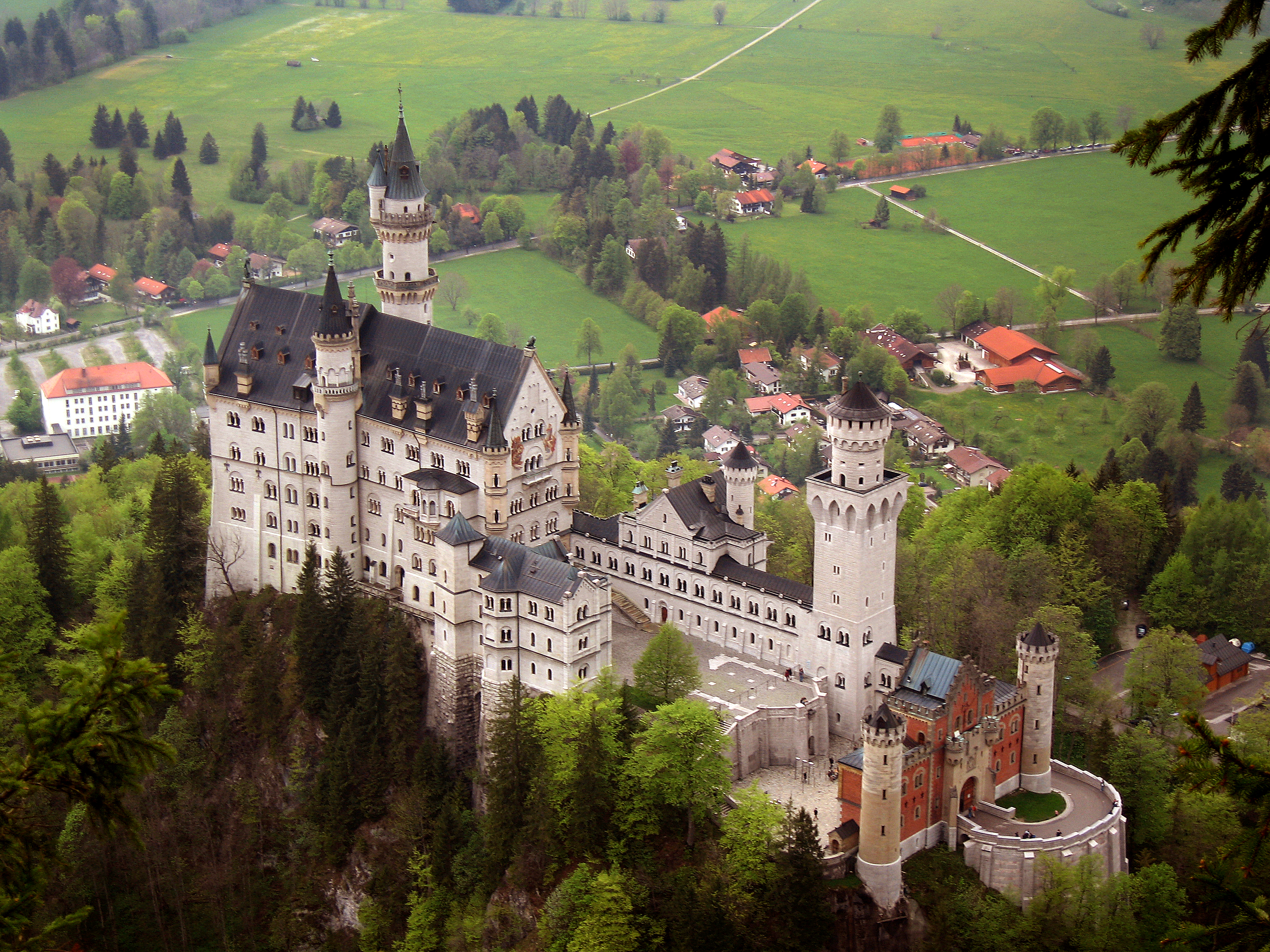
Neuschwanstein Castle seen from the southeast

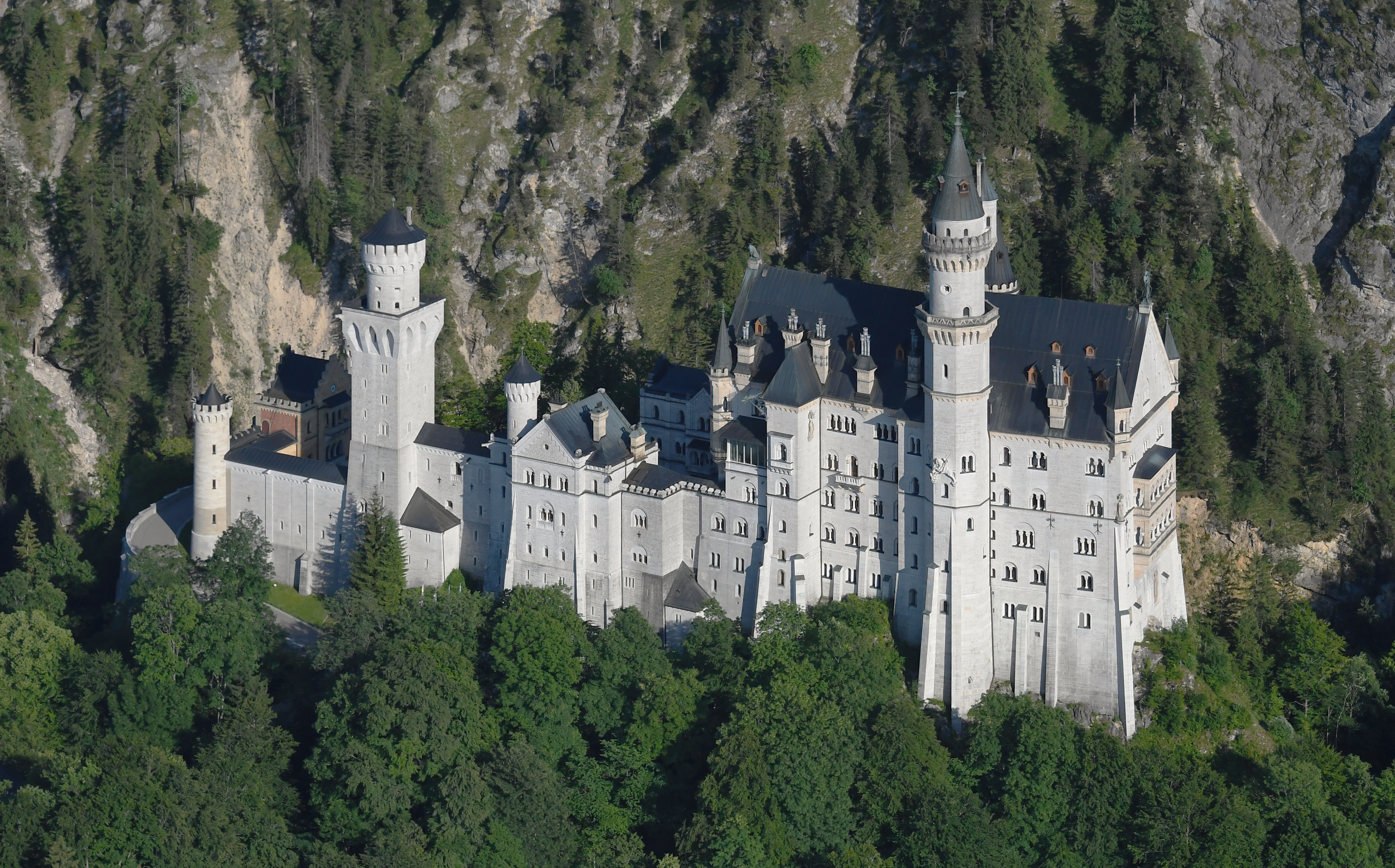
Aerial view from the northwest

The effect of the Neuschwanstein ensemble is highly stylistic, both externally and internally. The king's influence is apparent throughout, and he took a keen personal interest in the design and decoration. An example can be seen in his comments, or commands, regarding a mural depicting Lohengrin in the Palas: "His Majesty wishes that ... the ship be placed further from the shore, that Lohengrin's neck be less tilted, that the chain from the ship to the swan be of gold and not of roses, and finally that the style of the castle shall be kept medieval."

The suite of rooms within the Palas contains the Throne Room, King Ludwig's suite, the Singers' Hall, and the Grotto. The interior and especially the throne room, Byzantine-Arab construction, refers to the chapels and churches of the royal Sicilian Norman-Swabian period in Palermo related to the Kings of Germany House of Hohenstaufen. Throughout, the design pays homage to the German legends of Lohengrin, the Swan Knight. Hohenschwangau, where King Ludwig spent much of his youth, had decorations of these sagas. These themes were taken up in the operas of Richard Wagner. Many rooms bear a border depicting the various operas written by Wagner, including a theatre permanently featuring the set of one such play. Many of the interior rooms remain undecorated, with only 14 rooms finished before Ludwig's death. With the palace under construction at the King's death, one of the major features of the palace remained unbuilt. A massive keep, which would have formed the highest point and central focus of the ensemble, was planned for the middle of the upper courtyard but was never built, at the decision of the King's family. The foundation for the keep is visible in the upper courtyard.

Neuschwanstein Castle consists of several individual structures which were erected over a length of 150 metres on the top of a cliff ridge. The elongate building is furnished with numerous towers, ornamental turrets, gables, balconies, pinnacles, and sculptures. Following the Romanesque style, most window openings are fashioned as bi- and triforia. Against the backdrop of the Tegelberg and the Pöllat Gorge in the south and the Alpine foothills with their lakes in the north, the ensemble of individual buildings provides varying picturesque views of the palace from all directions. It was designed as the Romantic ideal of a knight's castle. Unlike real castles, whose building stock is in most cases the result of centuries of building activity, Neuschwanstein was planned from the inception as an intentionally asymmetric building, and erected in consecutive stages. Typical attributes of a castle were included, but real fortifications—the most important feature of a medieval aristocratic estate—were dispensed with.

=== Exterior ===
The palace complex is entered through the symmetrical Gatehouse flanked by two stair towers. The eastward-pointing gate building is the only structure of the palace whose wall area is fashioned in high-contrast colours; the exterior walls are cased with red bricks, the court fronts with yellow limestone. The roof cornice is surrounded by pinnacles. The upper floor of the Gatehouse is surmounted by a crow-stepped gable and held King Ludwig II's first lodging at Neuschwanstein, from which he occasionally observed the building work before the hall was completed. The ground floors of the Gatehouse were intended to accommodate the stables.

The passage through the Gatehouse, crowned with the royal coat of arms of Bavaria, leads directly into the courtyard. The courtyard has two levels; the lower one is defined to the east by the Gatehouse and to the north by the foundations of the Rectangular Tower and the gallery building. The southern end of the courtyard is open, imparting a view of the surrounding mountain scenery. At its western end, the courtyard is delimited by a brick embankment, whose polygonally protracting bulge marks the choir of the originally projected chapel; this three-nave church, never built, was intended to form the base of a 90-metre (295-ft) keep, the planned centerpiece of the architectural ensemble. A flight of steps at the side gives access to the upper level.

Today, the foundation plan of the chapel-keep is marked out in the upper-courtyard pavement. The most striking structure of the upper court level is the Rectangular Tower (45 metres or 148 feet). Like most of the court buildings, it mostly serves a decorative purpose as part of the ensemble. Its viewing platform provides a vast view over the Alpine foothills to the north. The Knights' House defines the northern end of the upper courtyard. The three-storey building is connected to the Rectangular Tower and the Gatehouse by means of a continuous gallery fashioned with a blind arcade. From the point of view of castle Romanticism, the Knights' House was the abode of a stronghold's menfolk; at Neuschwanstein, estate and service rooms were envisioned here. The Bower, which complements the Knights' House as the ladies' house but was never used as such, defines the south side of the courtyard. Both structures together form the motif of the Antwerp Castle featuring in the first act of Lohengrin. Embedded in the pavement is the floor plan of the planned palace chapel.

The western end of the courtyard is delimited by the Palas (hall). It constitutes the real main and residential building of the castle and contains the King's stateroom and the servants' rooms. The Palas is a colossal five-story structure in the shape of two huge cuboids that are connected at a flat angle and covered by two adjacent high gable roofs. The building's shape follows the course of the ridge. In its angles, there are two stair towers, the northern one surmounting the palace roof by several storeys with its height of 65 metres (213 ft). With their polymorphic roofs, both towers are reminiscent of the Château de Pierrefonds. The western front supports a two-story balcony with a view of the Alpsee, while northwards, a low chair tower and the conservatory protrude from the main structure. The entire Palas is spangled with numerous decorative chimneys and ornamental turrets, the court front with colourful frescos. The court-side gable is crowned with a copper lion, the western (outward) gable with the likeness of a knight.

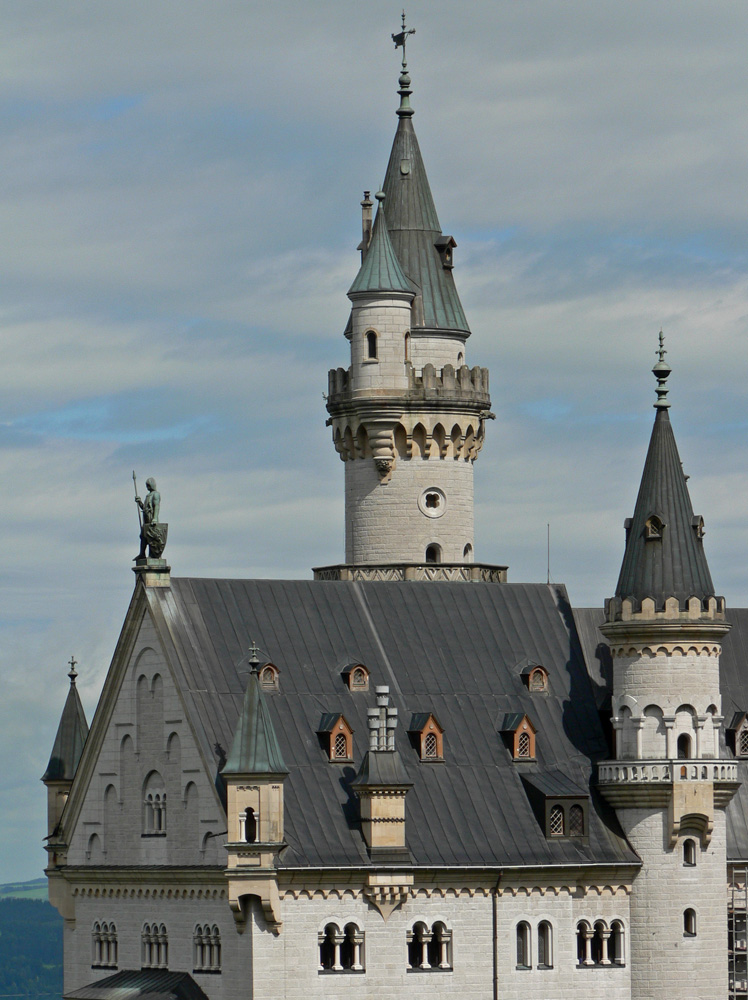
Palace roof

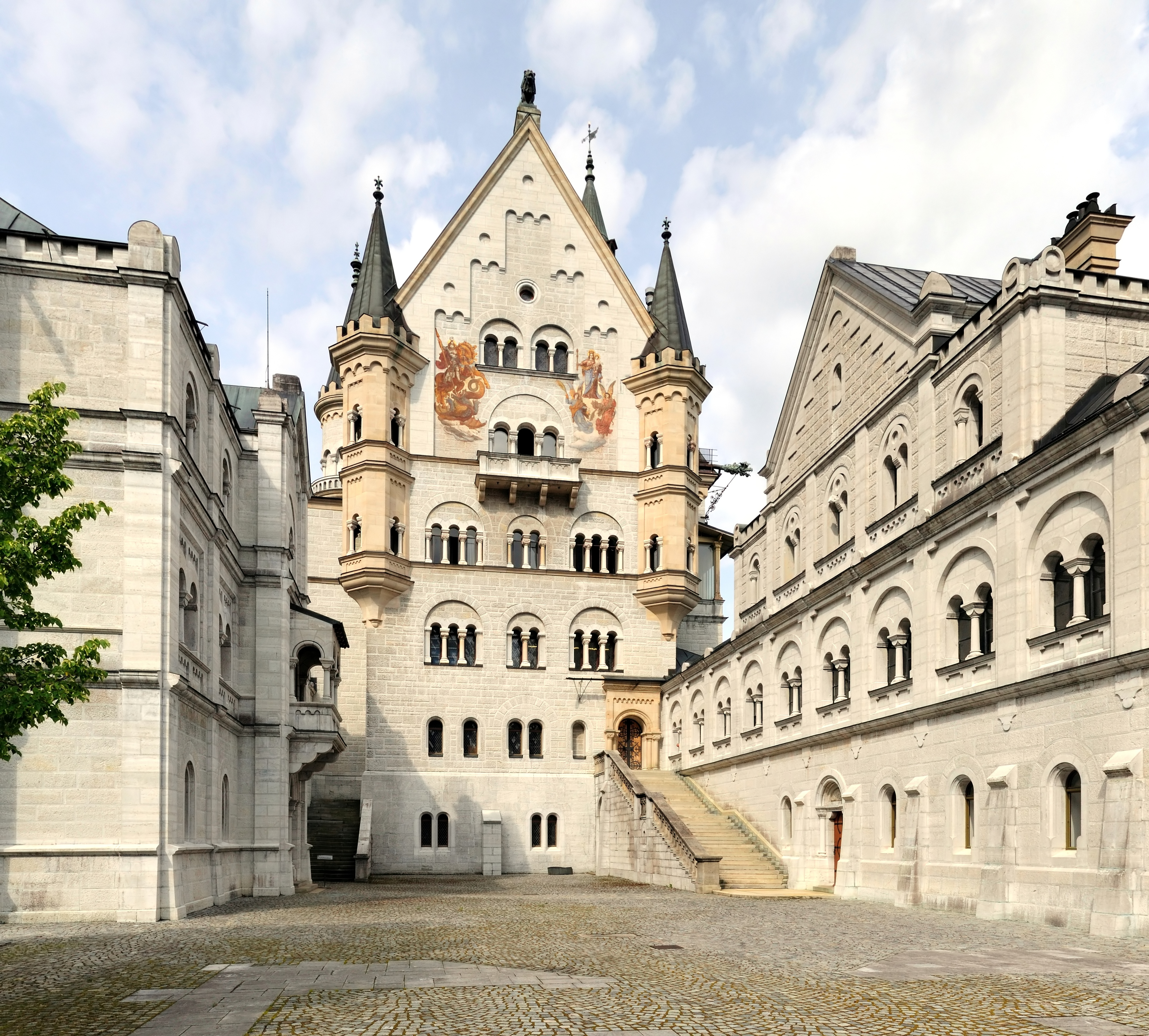
View from location of unrealised chapel along upper courtyard level: Bower (left, with balcony of Elsa von Brabant), palace front, and Knights' House (right), according to Wagner's stage directions for Antwerp Castle in the second act of Lohengrin

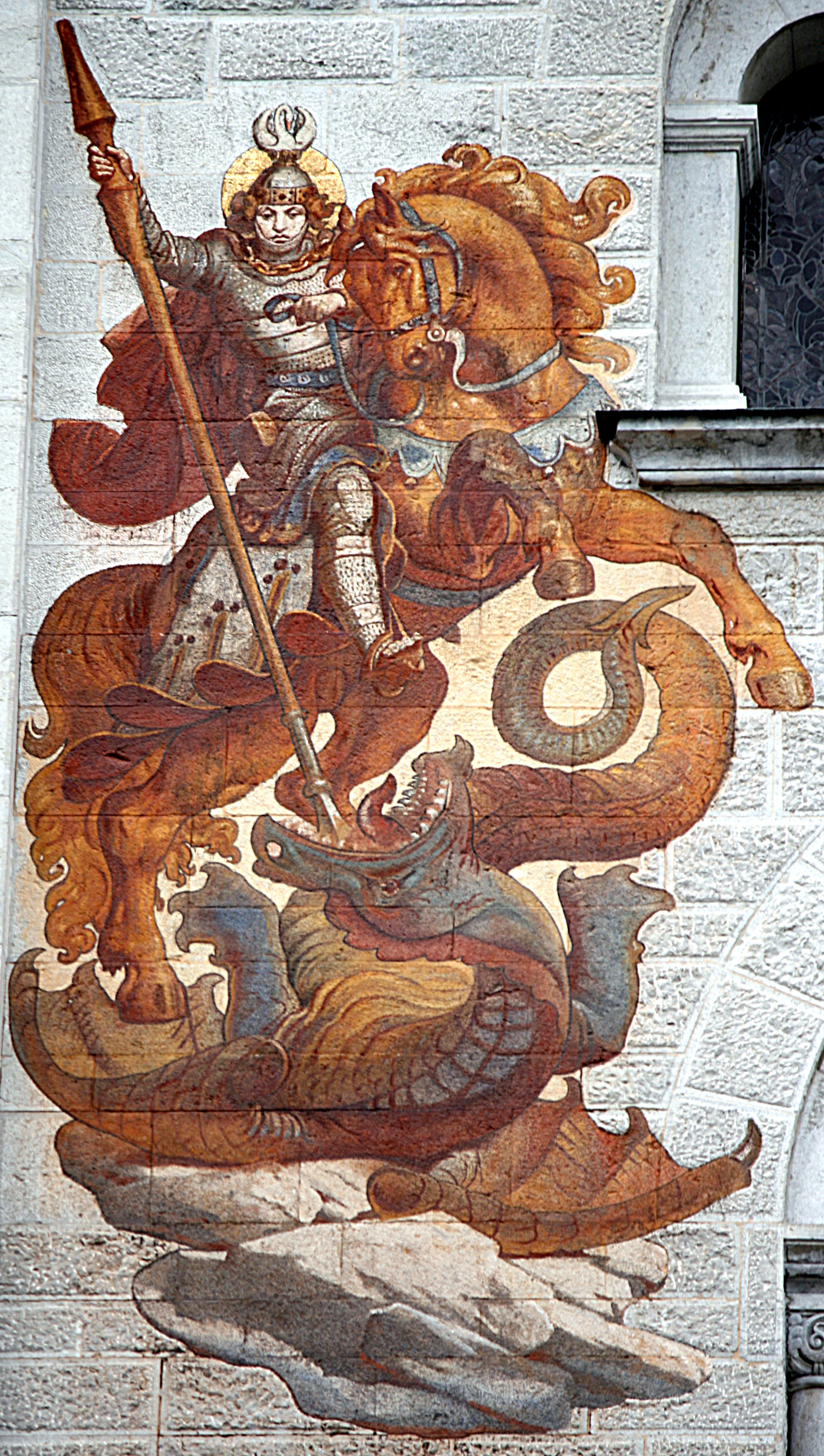
Saint George

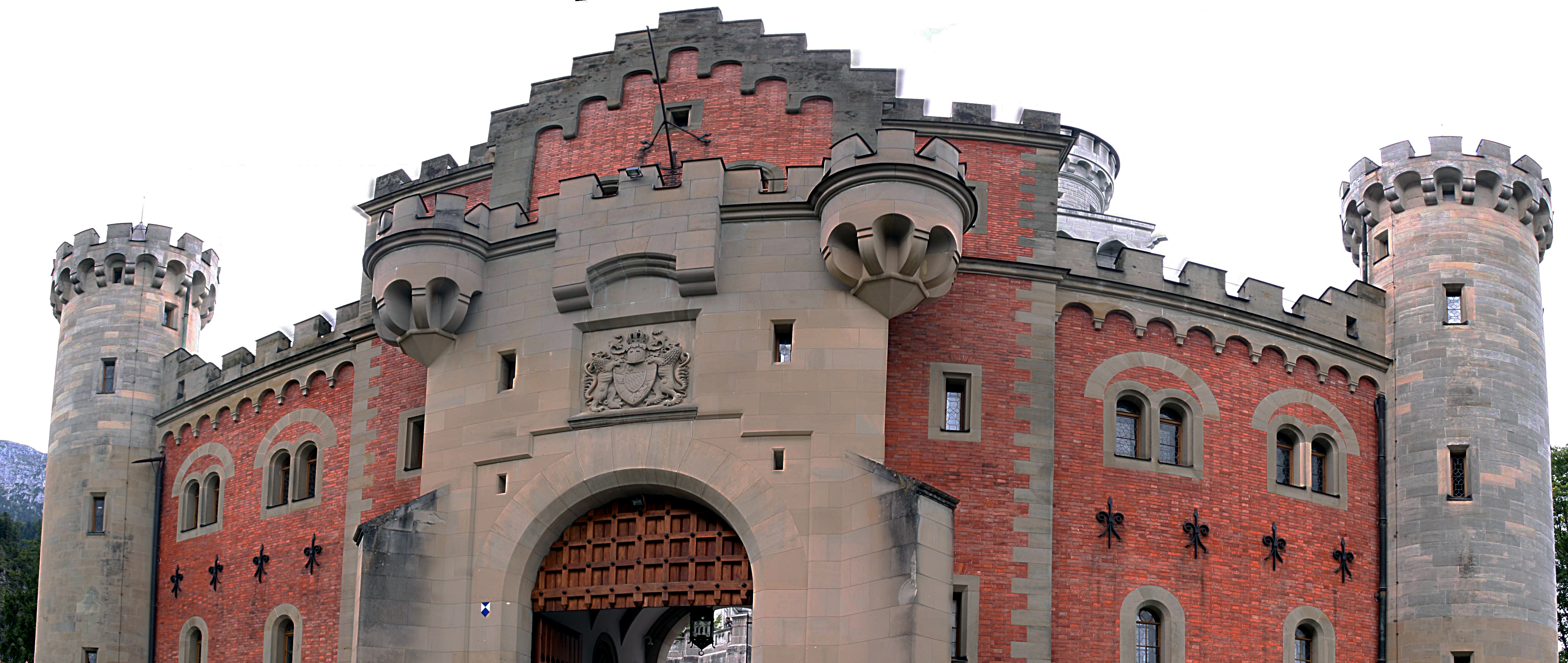
Gatehouse

=== Interior ===
Had it been completed, the palace would have had more than 200 interior rooms, including premises for guests and servants, as well as for service and logistics. Ultimately, no more than about 15 rooms and halls were finished. In its lower stories, the Palas accommodates administrative and servants' rooms and the rooms of today's palace administration. The King's staterooms are situated in the upper stories. The anterior structure accommodates the lodgings on the third floor, above them the Hall of the Singers. The upper floors of the west-facing posterior structure are filled almost completely by the Throne Hall. The total floor space of all floors amounts to nearly 6,000 square metres (65,000 sq ft).

Neuschwanstein houses numerous significant interior rooms of German historicism. The palace was fitted with several of the latest technical innovations of the late 19th century. Among other things, it had a battery-powered bell system for the servants and telephone lines. The kitchen equipment included a Rumford oven that turned the skewer with its heat and so automatically adjusted the turning speed. The hot air was used for a calorifère central heating system. Further novelties for the era were running warm water and toilets with automatic flushing.

The largest room of the palace by area is the Hall of the Singers, followed by the Throne Hall. The 27-by-10-metre (89 by 33 ft) Hall of the Singers is located in the eastern, court-side wing of the Palas, in the fourth floor above the King's lodgings. It is designed as an amalgamation of two rooms of the Wartburg: The Hall of the Singers and the Ballroom. It was one of the King's favourite projects for his palace. The rectangular room was decorated with themes from Lohengrin and Parzival. Its longer side is terminated by a gallery that is crowned by a tribune, modelled after the Wartburg. The eastern narrow side is terminated by a stage that is structured by arcades and known as the Sängerlaube. The Hall of the Singers was never designed for court festivities of the reclusive King. Rather, like the Throne Hall, it served as a walkable monument in which the culture of knights and courtly love of the Middle Ages was represented. The first performance in this hall took place in 1933 and was a concert commemorating the 50th anniversary of Richard Wagner's death.

The Throne Hall, 20 by 12 metres (66 by 39 ft), is situated in the west wing of the Palas. With its height of 13 metres (43 ft), it occupies the third and fourth floors. Julius Hofmann modelled it after the Allerheiligen-Hofkirche in the Munich Residenz. On three sides, it is surrounded by colorful arcades, ending in an apse that was intended to hold King Ludwig's throne but that was never completed. The throne dais is surrounded by paintings of Jesus, the Twelve Apostles, and six canonised kings. The mural paintings were created by Wilhelm Hauschild. The floor mosaic was completed after the king's death. The chandelier is fashioned after a Byzantine crown. The Throne Hall makes a sacral impression. Following the king's wish, it amalgamated the Grail Hall from Parzival with a symbol of the divine right of kings, an incorporation of unrestricted sovereign power, which King Ludwig, as the head of a constitutional monarchy, no longer held. The union of the sacral and regal is emphasised by the portraits in the apse of six canonised Kings: Saint Louis of France, Saint Stephen of Hungary, Saint Edward the Confessor of England, Saint Wenceslaus of Bohemia, Saint Olaf of Norway, and Saint Henry, Holy Roman Emperor.

Palace rooms (late 19th-century photochrom prints)

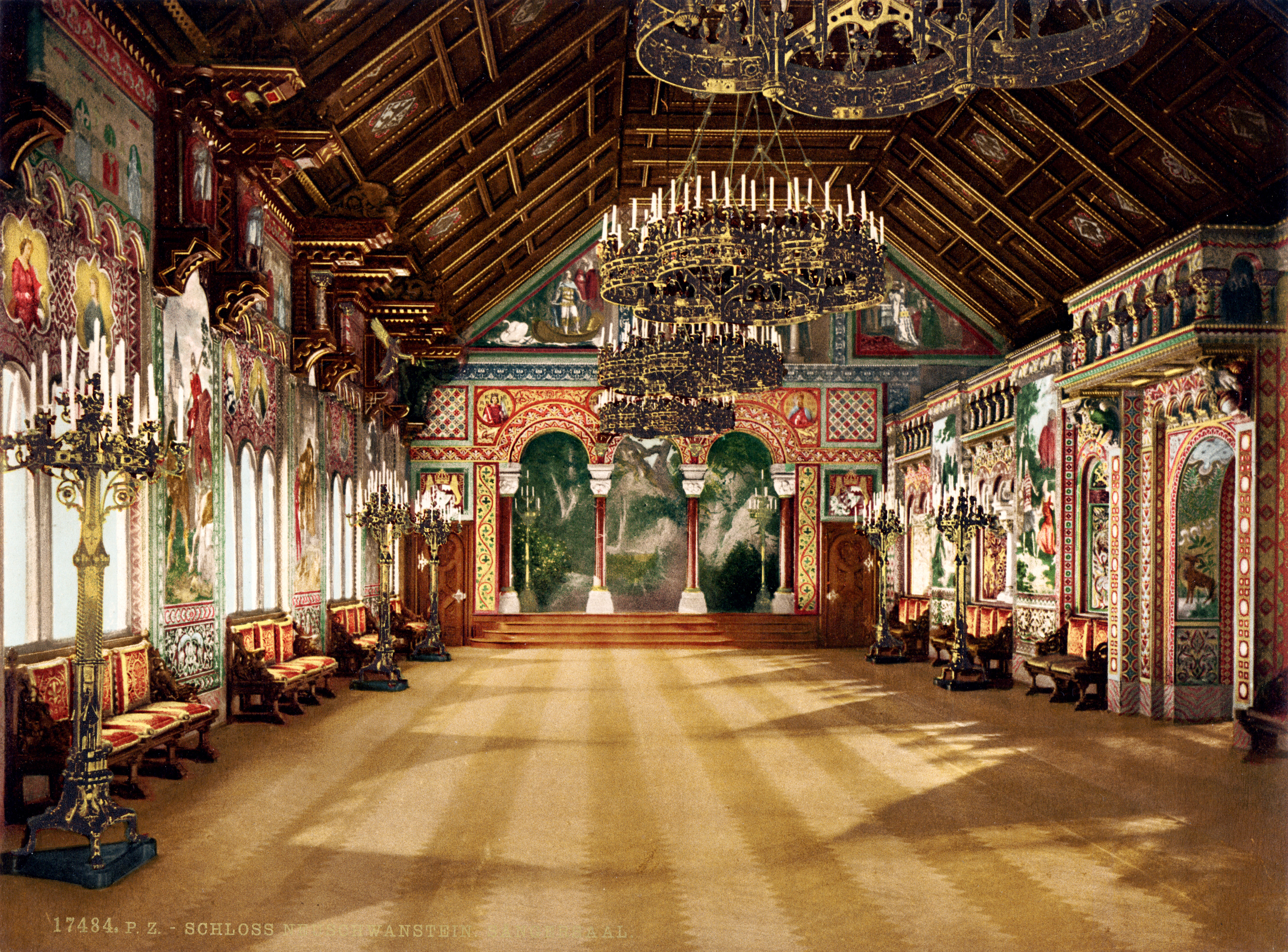
Hall of the Singers

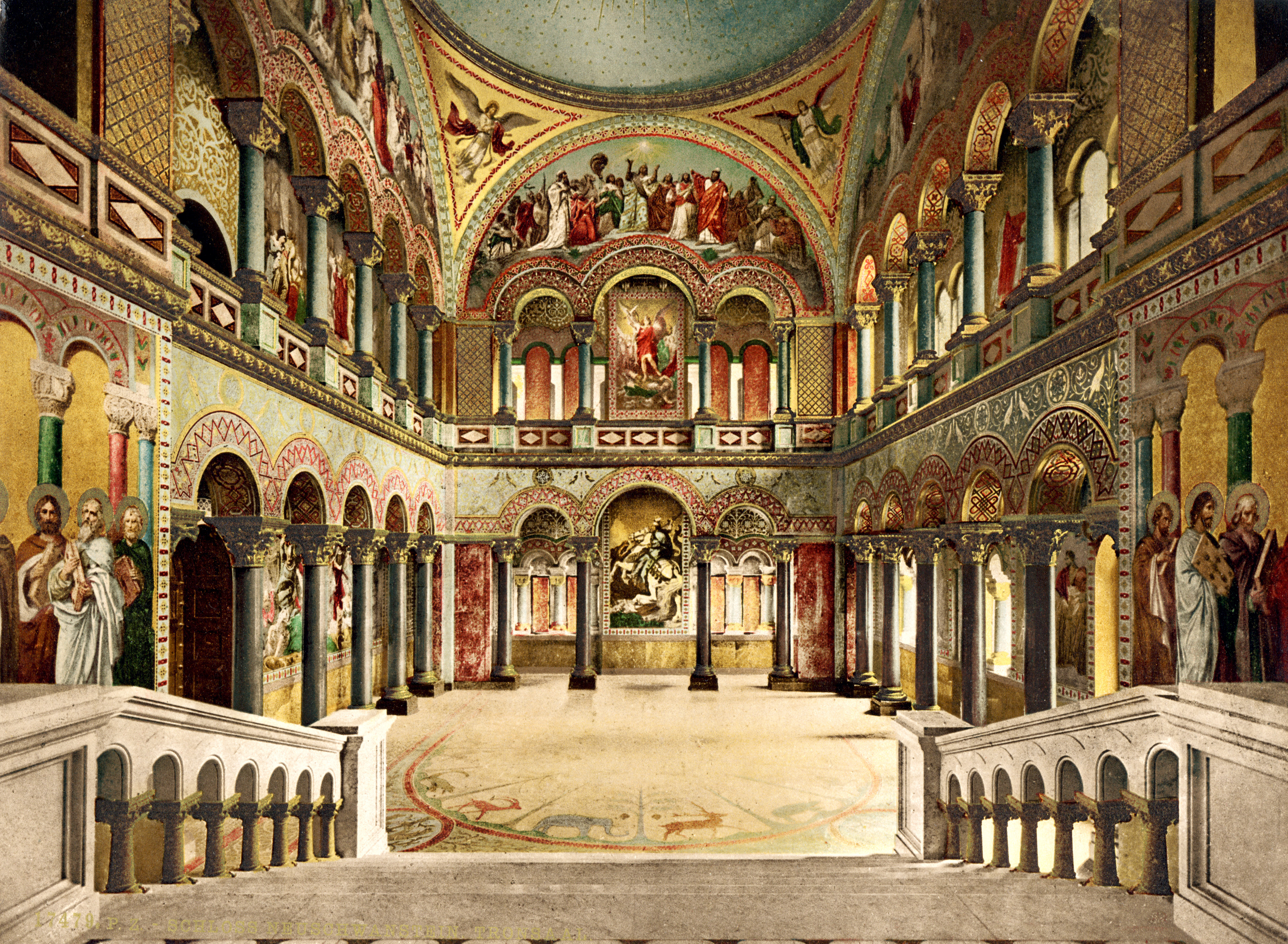
Throne Hall

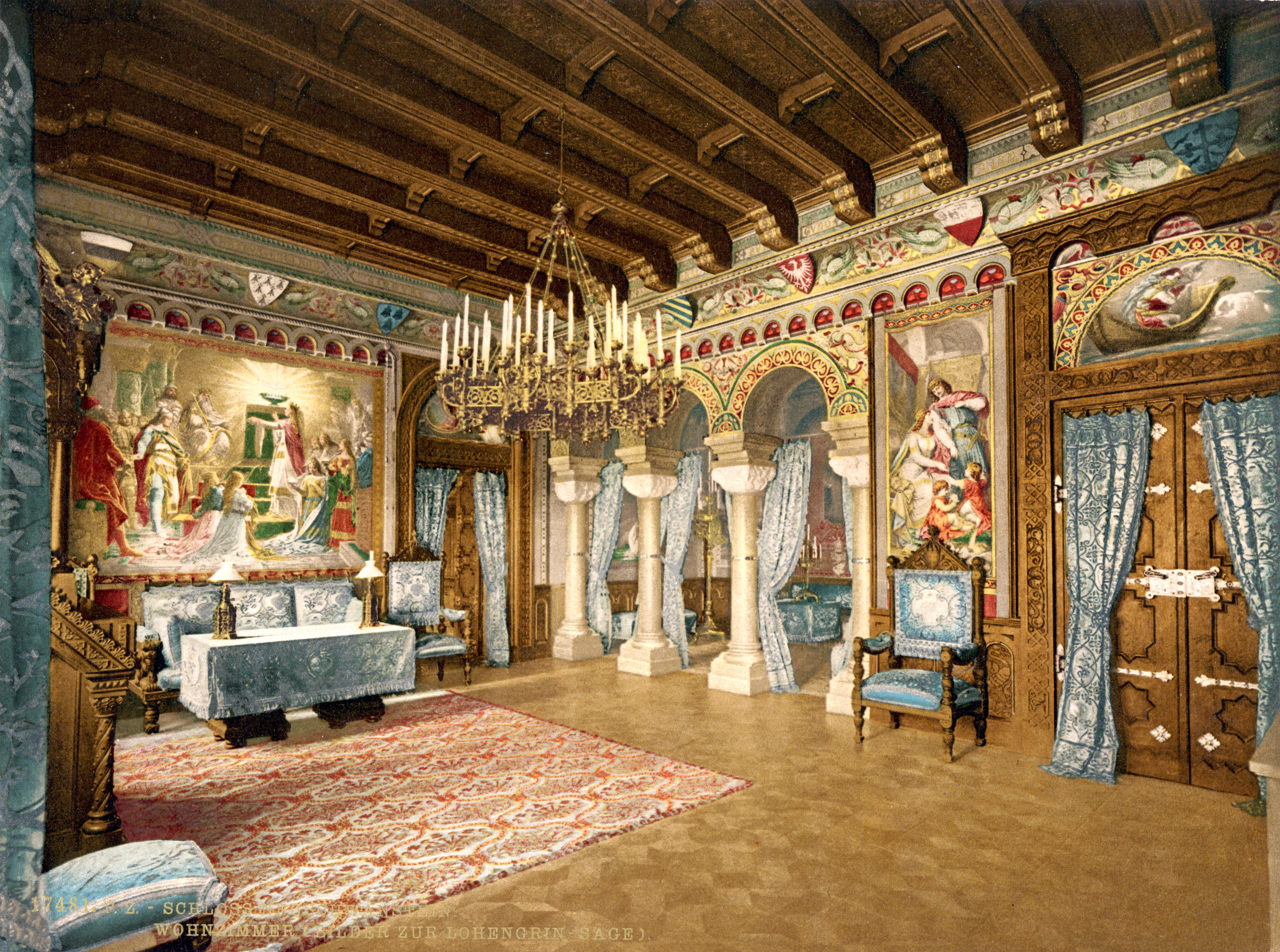
Drawing room

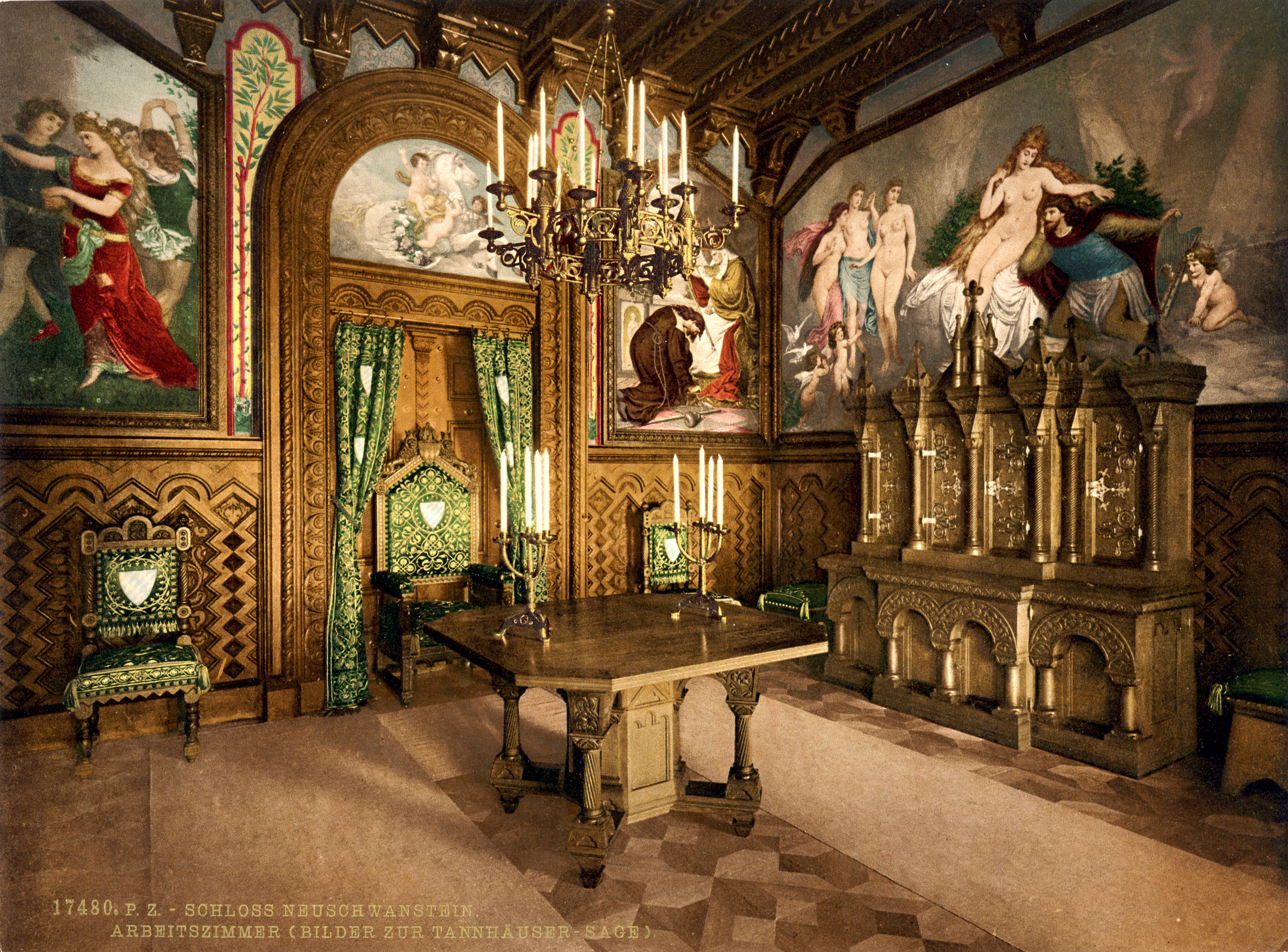
Study

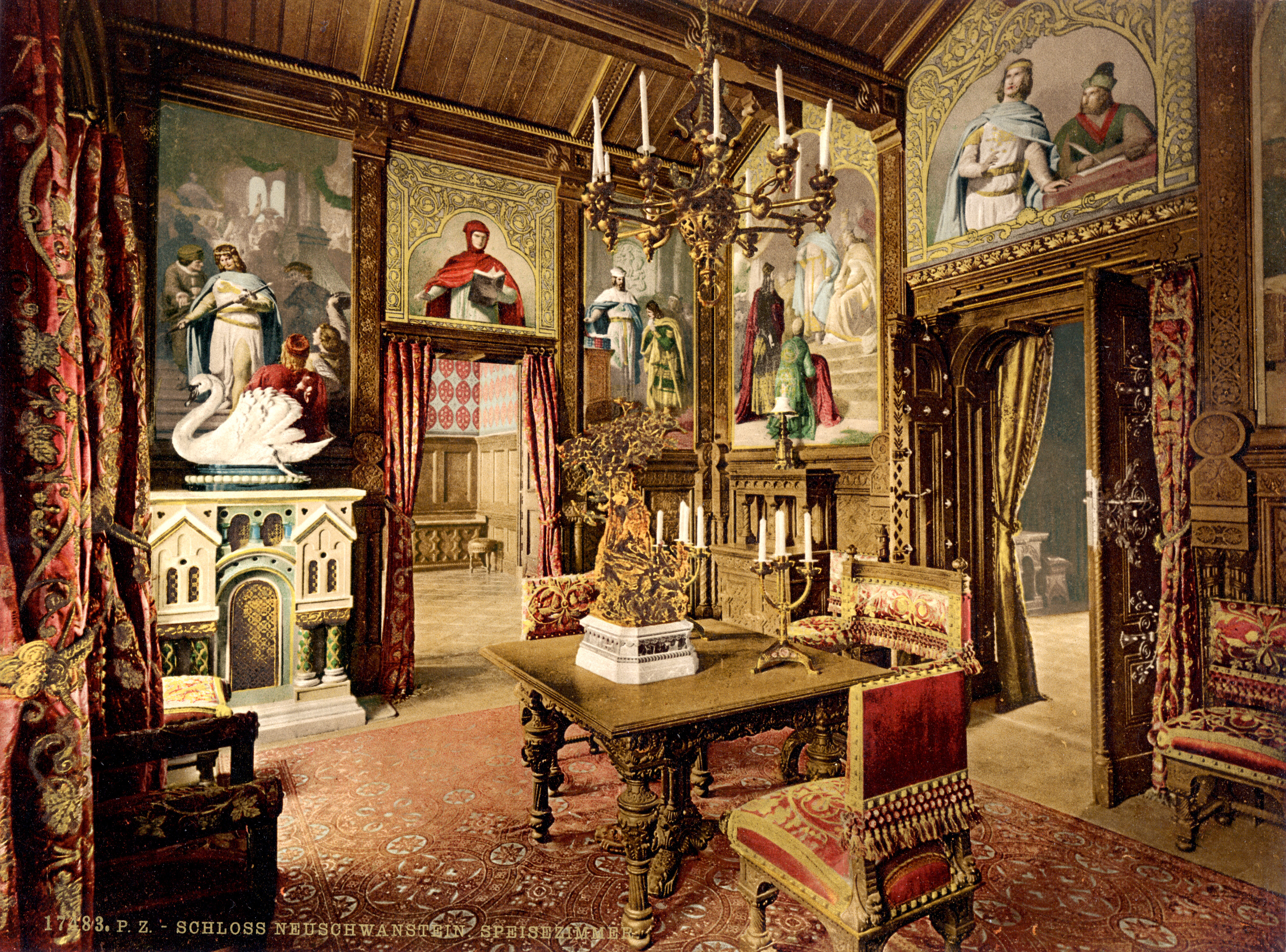
Dining room

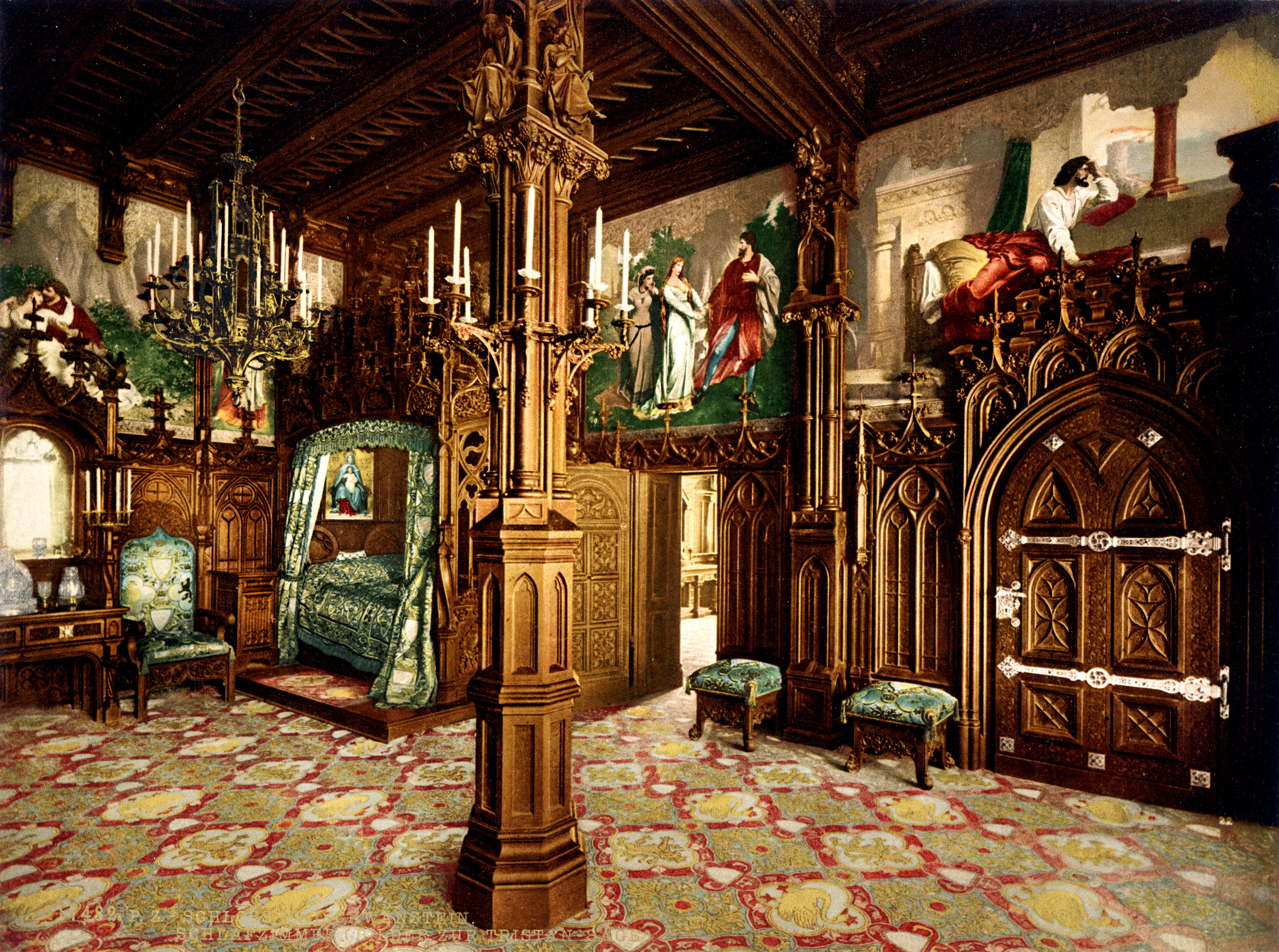
Bedroom

Apart from the large ceremonial rooms, several smaller rooms were created for use by King Ludwig II. The royal lodging is on the third floor of the palace in the east wing of the Palas. It consists of eight rooms with living space and several smaller rooms. In spite of the gaudy décor, the living space, with its moderate room size and its sofas and suites, makes a relatively modern impression on today's visitors. King Ludwig II did not attach importance to the representative requirements of former times, in which the life of a monarch was mostly public. The interior decoration with mural paintings, tapestry, furniture, and other handicraft generally refers to the King's favourite themes: the grail legend, the works of Wolfram von Eschenbach, and their interpretation by Richard Wagner.

The eastward drawing room is adorned with themes from the Lohengrin legend. The furniture, including a sofa, a table, armchairs, and seats in a northward alcove, is comfortable and homelike. Next to the drawing room is a little artificial grotto that forms the passage to the study. The unusual room, originally equipped with an artificial waterfall and a rainbow machine, is connected to a little conservatory. Depicting the Hörselberg grotto, it relates to Wagner's Tannhäuser, as does the décor of the adjacent study. In the park of Linderhof Palace, the King had installed a similar grotto of greater dimensions. Opposite the study follows the dining room, adorned with themes of courtly love. Since the kitchen in Neuschwanstein is situated three stories below the dining room, it was impossible to install a wishing table (dining table disappearing by means of a mechanism) as at Linderhof Palace and Herrenchiemsee. Instead, the dining room was connected with the kitchen by means of a service lift.

The bedroom adjacent to the dining room and the subsequent house chapel are the only rooms of the palace that remain in the Neo-Gothic style. The King's bedroom is dominated by a huge bed adorned with carvings. Fourteen carvers worked more than four years on the bed canopy with its numerous pinnacles and on the oaken panellings. It was in this room that Ludwig was arrested on the night between 11 and 12 June 1886. The adjacent little house chapel is consecrated to Saint Louis, after whom the owner was named.

The servant rooms are in the basement of the Palas, and are quite scantily equipped with massive oak furniture. Besides one table and one cabinet, there are two beds of 1.80 metres (5 ft 11 in) length each. Translucent glass windows separated the rooms from the corridor that connects the exterior stairs with the main stairs, so that the King could enter and leave unseen. The servants were not allowed to use the main stairs but were restricted to the much narrower and steeper servants' stairs.

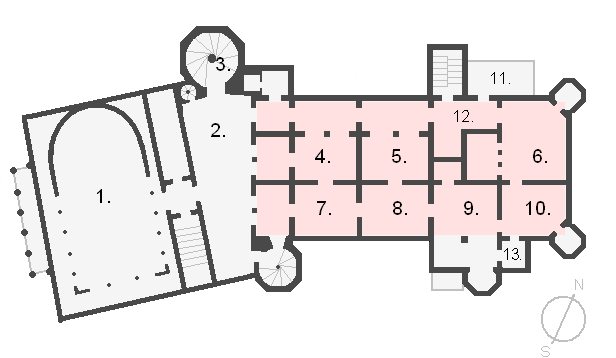
Floor plan of third floor, position of fourth-floor Hall of the Singers marked in red

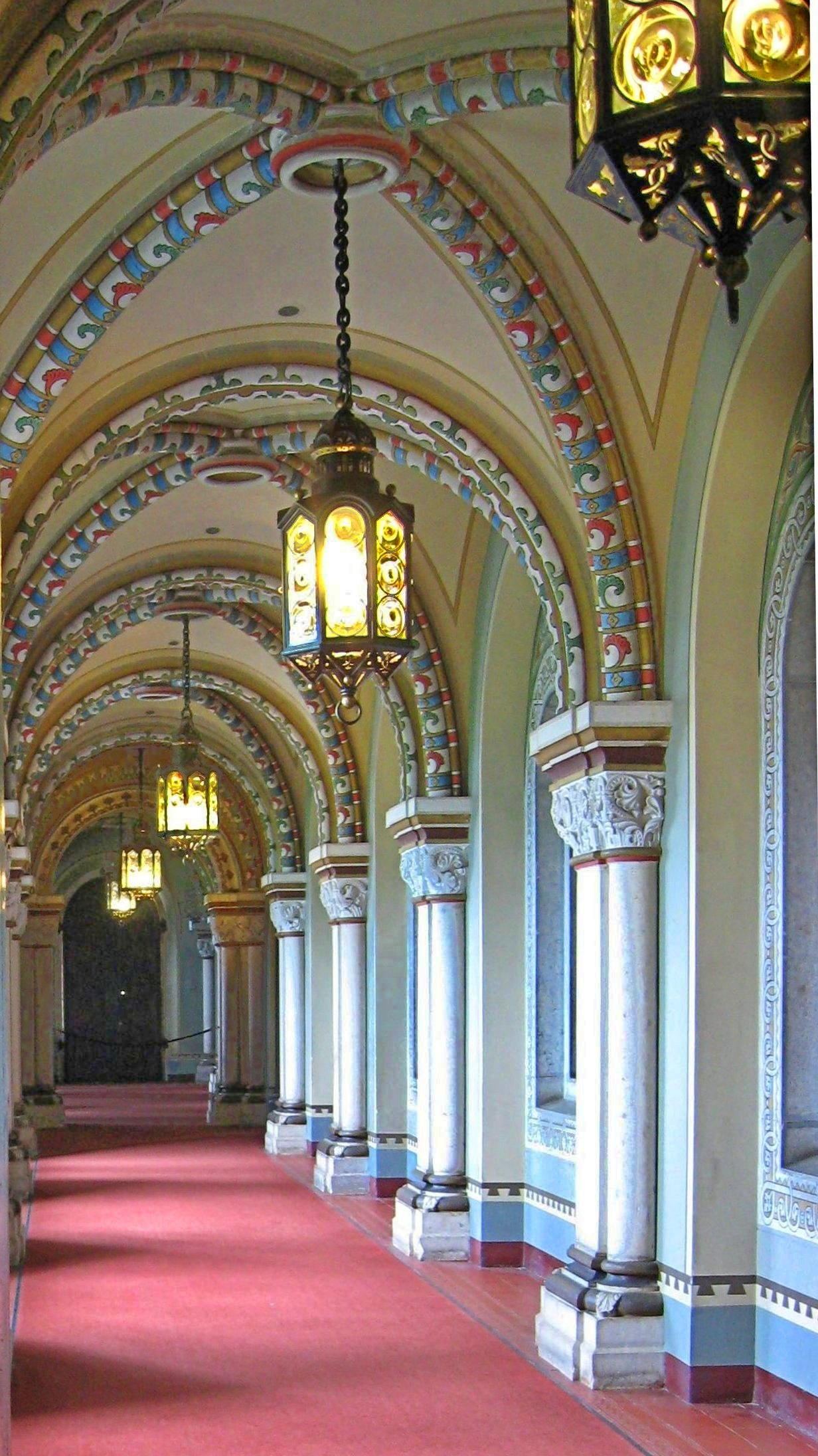
Corridor

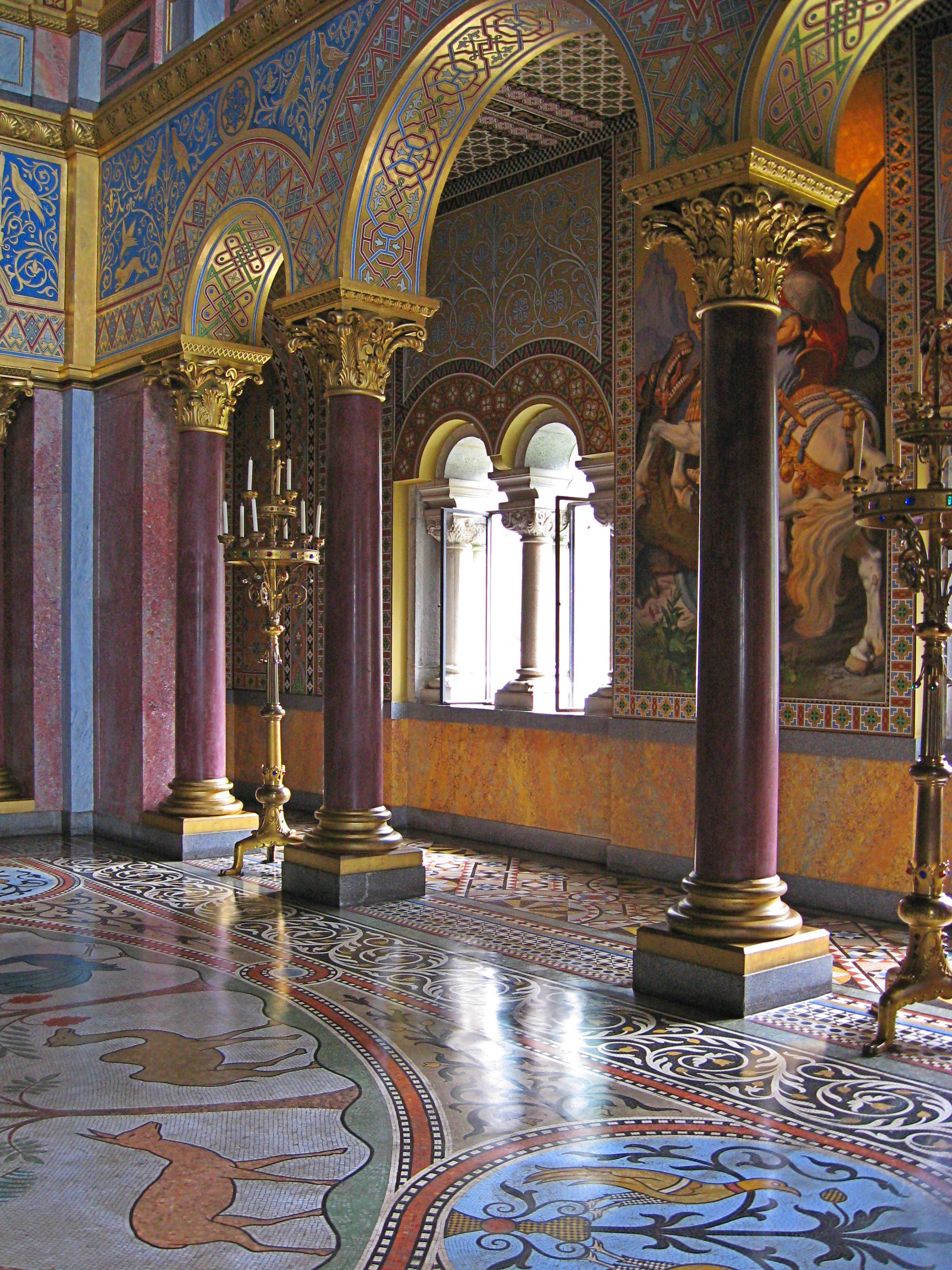
Throne Hall detail

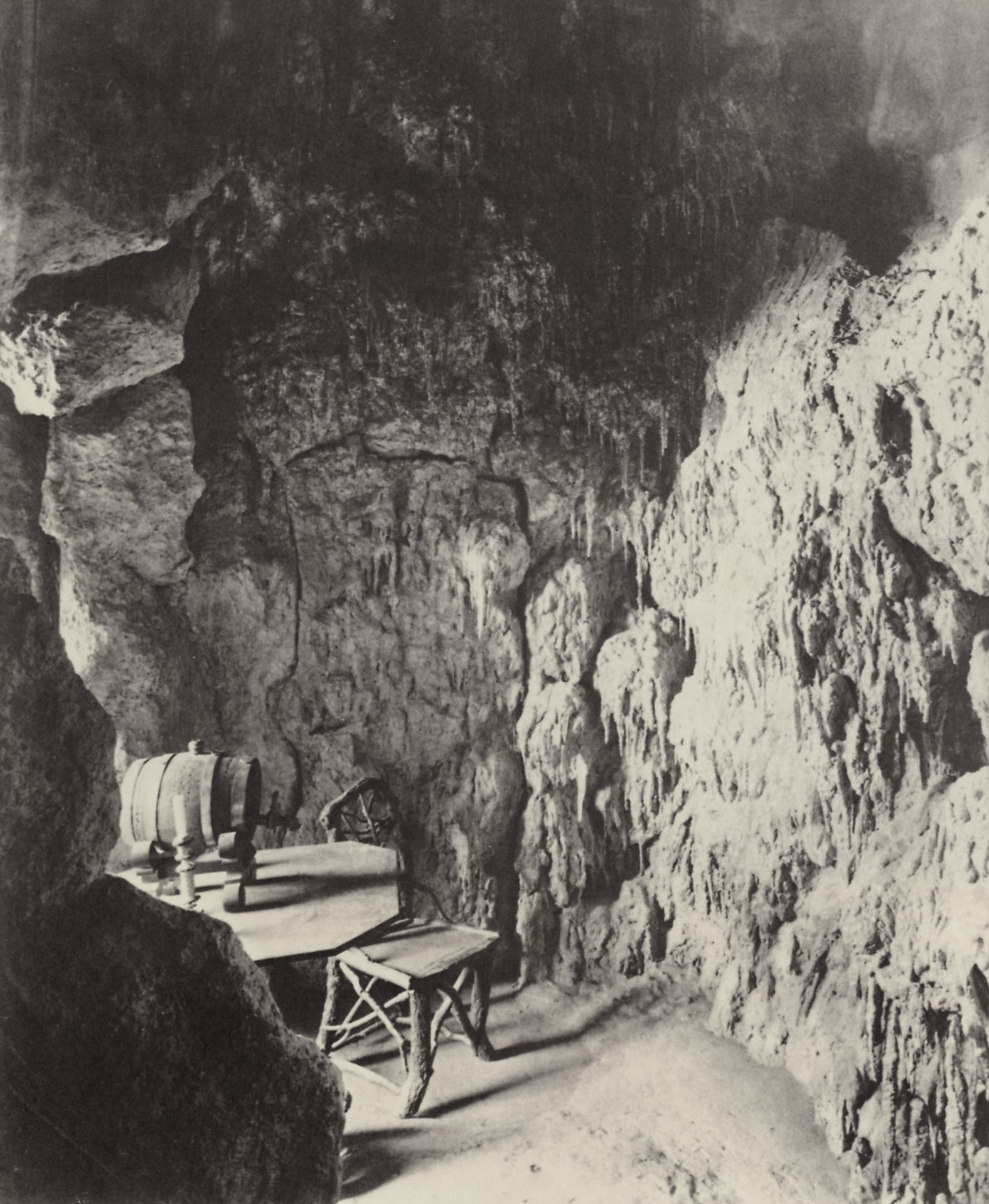
Grotto

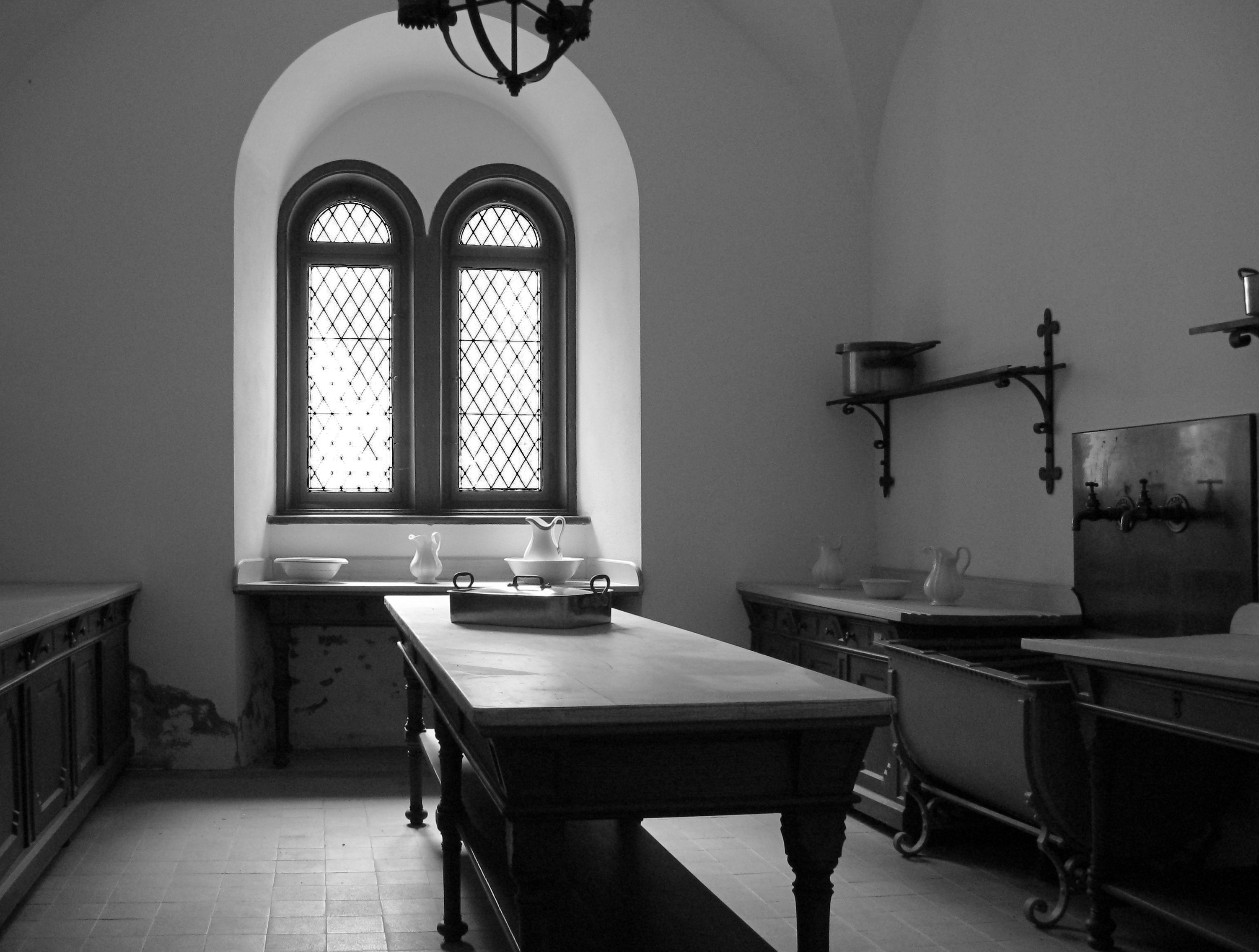
Kitchen

== Tourism ==
Neuschwanstein welcomes almost 1.5 million visitors per year, making it one of the most popular tourist destinations in Europe. For security reasons, the palace can only be visited via a 35-minute guided tour, and no photography is allowed inside the castle. There are also special guided tours that focus on specific topics. During the peak season from June to August, Neuschwanstein receives as many as 6,000 visitors per day, and guests without reservations may have to wait several hours. Those without tickets may still walk the long driveway from the base to the top of the mountain and visit the grounds and courtyard without a ticket, but they will not be admitted to the interior of the castle. Ticket sales are processed exclusively via the ticket centre in Hohenschwangau. As of 2008, the total number of visitors exceeded 60 million. In 2004, the revenues were booked as €6.5 million.

On 14 June 2023, two young American tourists were assaulted by a 30-year-old American near Marienbrücke, killing one of them.

== Culture, art, and science ==
Neuschwanstein is a global symbol of the era of Romanticism. The palace has appeared prominently in several movies and games such as Helmut Käutner's Ludwig II (1955) and Luchino Visconti's Ludwig (1972), both biopics about the King; the musical Chitty Chitty Bang Bang (1968), the spoof comedy Spaceballs, and the war drama The Great Escape (1963), including the Soarin’ attraction during the Soarin’ Around The World/Soaring Over The Horizon/Soaring: Fantastic Flight incarnation (both 2016 and 2019) at Disneyland, Walt Disney World, Tokyo Disneyland, and Shanghai Disneyland. It served as the inspiration for Disneyland's Sleeping Beauty Castle and Cinderella Castle, Cameran Palace in the animated Pokémon film Lucario and The Mystery of Mew (2005), and later similar structures. It is also visited by the character Grace Nakimura alongside Herrenchiemsee in the game The Beast Within: A Gabriel Knight Mystery (1996). It is also featured in the Globe Trot party game on the game Wii Party (2010).

In 1977, Neuschwanstein Castle became the motif of a West German definitive stamp, and it appeared on a €2 commemorative coin for the German Bundesländer series in 2012. In 2007, it was a finalist in the widely publicised online selection of the New Seven Wonders of the World. A meteorite that reached Earth spectacularly on 6 April 2002 at the Austrian border near Hohenschwangau was named Neuschwanstein after the palace. Three fragments were found: Neuschwanstein I (1.75 kg (3.9 lb), found July 2002) and Neuschwanstein II (1.63 kg (3.6 lb), found May 2003) on the German side, and Neuschwanstein III (2.84 kg (6.3 lb), found June 2003) on the Austrian side near Reutte. The meteorite is classified as an enstatite chondrite with unusually large proportions of pure iron (29%), enstatite, and the extremely rare mineral sinoite (Si_{2}N_{2}O).

On 12 July 2025, Neuschwanstein Castle was designated as a World Heritage Site by UNESCO, along with Linderhof, Schachen, and Herrenchiemsee.

== Panoramas ==
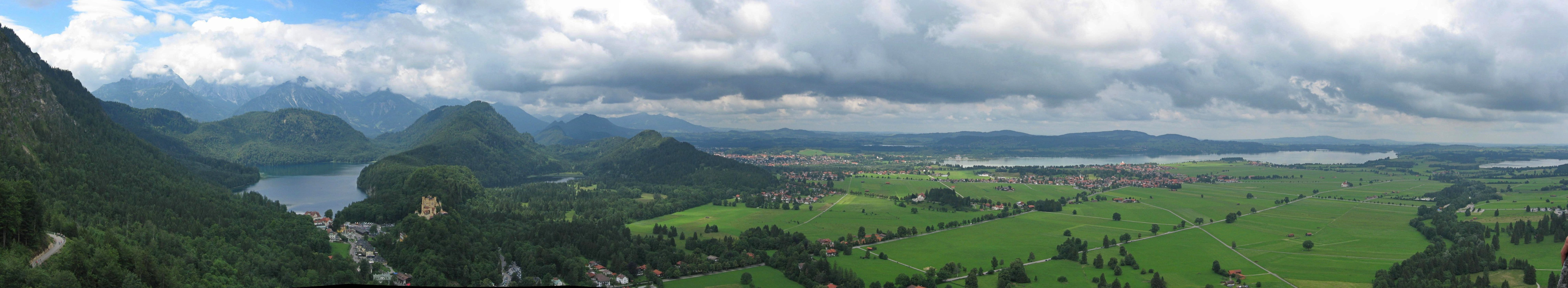
Modern panorama from Neuschwanstein (1,008 m or 3,307 ft) showing (left to right): palace access road; Alpsee with locality of Hohenschwangau in front; 19th-century Hohenschwangau Castle on a hill with Schwansee behind it on the right (west); locality of Alterschrofen with town of Füssen behind it; core of Schwangau in front of large Forggensee reservoir (1952); Bannwaldsee (north)
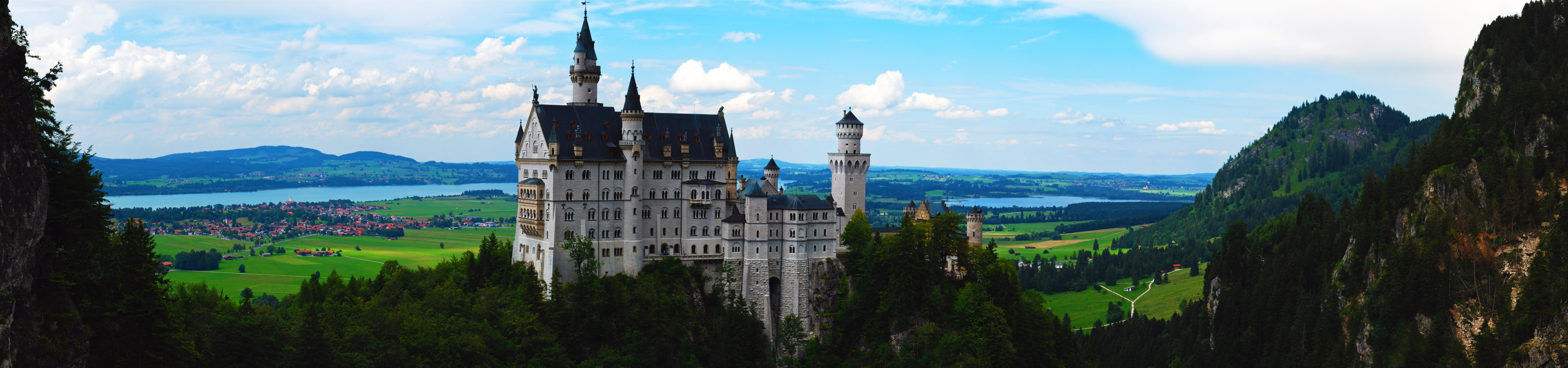
Neuschwanstein Castle as seen from Marienbrücke (Marie's Bridge, or Pöllatbrücke). Marienbrücke is across the Pöllat directly behind and directly visible from Neuschwanstein Castle. Ludwig II of Bavaria named the bridge after his mother, Marie of Prussia.

== See also ==
- List of castles in Bavaria
- List of castles in Germany

== Sources ==
- Ammon, Thomas (2007), Ludwig II. für Dummies: Der Märchenkönig—Zwischen Wahn, Wagner und Neuschwanstein, Wiley-VCH, ISBN 978-3-527-70319-7
- "Faltlhauser begrüßte 50-millionsten Besucher im Schloss Neuschwanstein" [Faltlhauser welcomed the 50 millionth visitor in Neuschwanstein Castle] (Press release) (in German). Bayerisches Staatsministerium der Finanzen. 27 July 2005. Archived from the original on 16 July 2011.
- "Neue Homepage für Schloss Neuschwanstein in fünf Sprachen" [New website for Neuschwanstein Castle in five languages] (Press release) (in German). Bayerisches Staatsministerium der Finanzen. 28 July 2008.
- "Pschierer: Schloss Neuschwanstein ist heute eine weltweite Premiummarke" [Pschierer: Neuschwanstein Castle today is a global premium brand] (Press release) (in German). Bayerisches Staatsministerium der Finanzen. 19 September 2009. Archived from the original on 16 July 2011.
- Neuschwanstein Castle: Official Guide, Munich: Bayerische Verwaltung der staatlichen Schlösser, Gärten und Seen, 2004
- Biedermann, Henning (April 2009), Neuschwanstein auf dem Weg zum Weltkulturerbe? Noch mehr Ruhm—noch mehr Schutz für das Königsschloss, Bayerisches Fernsehen, archived from the original on 20 April 2009
- Bitterauf, Theodor (1910), "Ludwig II. (König von Baiern)", Allgemeine Deutsche Biographie (in German), vol. 55, pp. 540–555(German WikiSource)
- Blunt, Wilfried (1970), Ludwig II.: König von Bayern, Heyne, ISBN 978-3-453-55006-3
- Blunt, Wilfred (1973), The Dream King: Ludwig II of Bavaria, Penguin Books, ISBN 978-0-14-003606-0
- Buchali, Frank (2009). "Schwangau: Neuschwanstein – Traumschloss als Postkartenmotiv" (PDF) (in German). burgen-web.de.
- Desing, Julius (1992), Royal Castle Neuschwanstein, Kienberger
- Farmer, Walter I. (2002), Die Bewahrer des Erbes: Das Schicksal deutscher Kulturgüter am Ende des Zweiten Weltkrieges, Gruyter, ISBN 978-3-89949-010-7
- Hatton, Barry (29 July 2007). "New 7 wonders of the world are named". Deseret News. Associated Press. Archived from the original on 11 July 2010.
- Heinlein, Dieter (2004), Die Feuerkugel vom 6. April 2002 und der sensationelle Meteoritenfall "Neuschwanstein", Augsburg: Deutsches Feuerkugelnetz
- Koch von Berneck, Max (1887), München und die Königsschlösser Herrenchiemsee, Neuschwanstein, Hohenschwangau, Linderhof und Berg, Zürich: Caesar Schmidt
- Linnenkamp, Rolf (1986), Die Schlösser und Projekte Ludwigs II., Heyne, ISBN 978-3-453-02269-0
- Merkle, Ludwig (2001), Ludwig II. und seine Schlösser, Stiebner, ISBN 978-3-8307-1024-0
- "National Archives Announces Discovery of "Hitler Albums" Documenting Looted Art" (Press release). National Archives. 1 November 2007.
- Petzet, Michael; Bunz, Achim (1995), Gebaute Träume: Die Schlösser Ludwigs II. von Bayern, Hirmer, pp. 46–123, ISBN 978-3-7774-6600-2
- Parkyn, Neil (2002), Siebzig Wunderwerke der Architektur, zweitausendeins, ISBN 978-3-86150-454-2
- Petzet, M.; Hojer, G. (1991), Amtlicher Führer Schloss Neuschwanstein, Bayerische Verwaltung der staatlichen Schlösser, Gärten und Seen
- Pevsner, Nikolaus; Honour, Hugh; Fleming, John (1992), Lexikon der Weltarchitektur, Prestel, ISBN 3-7913-2095-5
- Rauch, Alexander (1991), Neuschwanstein, Atlantis Verlag, ISBN 978-3-88199-874-1
- Schlim, Jean Louis (2001), Ludwig II.: Traum und Technik, Buchendorfer Verlag, ISBN 978-3-934036-52-9
- Schröck, Rudolf (November 2007), "Madness in Bavaria", The Atlantic Times
- Smith, Alex (2008), Is Authenticity Important? (PDF), London: Royal College of Art
- Spangenberg, Marcus (1999), The Throne Room in Schloss Neuschwanstein: Ludwig II of Bavaria and his Vision of Divine Right, Schnell & Steiner, ISBN 978-3-7954-1233-3
- Sykora, Katharina (2004), "Ein Bild von einem Mann". Ludwig II. von Bayern: Konstruktion und Rezeption eines Mythos, Campus Verlag, ISBN 978-3-593-37479-6
