= Neuschwanstein murder =

2023 attack in Germany

On 14 June 2023, 21-year-old Eva Liu was murdered by 30-year-old Troy Philip Bohling in Schwangau, Bavaria, Germany. Both Liu and Bohling were American tourists visiting the area to see Neuschwanstein Castle. Bohling had attacked Liu and her friend at a cliffside to sexually assault them before pushing both women into a ravine below.

== Victims ==
Eva Liu had graduated from Illinois Math and Science Academy; both Liu and her friend Kelsey Chang had been awarded undergraduate degrees from the University of Illinois Urbana-Champaign in May 2023. The school released the following statement: "Our University of Illinois family is mourning the senseless death of Ms. Liu and the attack on Ms. Chang [her friend]. Both had just graduated in May and should have been able to celebrate such an important accomplishment without the fear of such a tragic outcome. Our thoughts are with Ms. Chang as she recovers and with both of their families as they grieve."

Liu's relatives described her as "a bright and inquisitive student with many passions, including baking, travelling, and music".

== The attack ==
Germany's Neuschwanstein Castle was the two women's last stop of the graduation trip to Germany. The prosecutor said that the two former students' chance encounter with the man who would later attack them was a coincidence. They both slipped at the same spot on the mountain road.

The attacker lured the two friends away from the Marienbrücke bridge, a popular viewpoint for the castle. He led them to a hidden trail, telling them that the way to the bridge was difficult to navigate.

He then shoved Liu to the ground, raping and strangling her before her friend tried to stop him. He pushed her friend into the 50 m (164 ft) deep ravine and continued assaulting Liu, strangling her with a belt and recording it. He then pushed Liu into the same ravine as he was disturbed by hikers.

Liu's friend alerted the authorities. Both women were airlifted by a helicopter to a nearby hospital, but Liu later died of her serious injuries.

== Trial and conviction ==
Bohling was arrested shortly after the incident and charged with murder and attempted murder. He was convicted and sentenced to life in prison in February 2024.
