= Georg von Dollmann =

German architect (1830-1895)

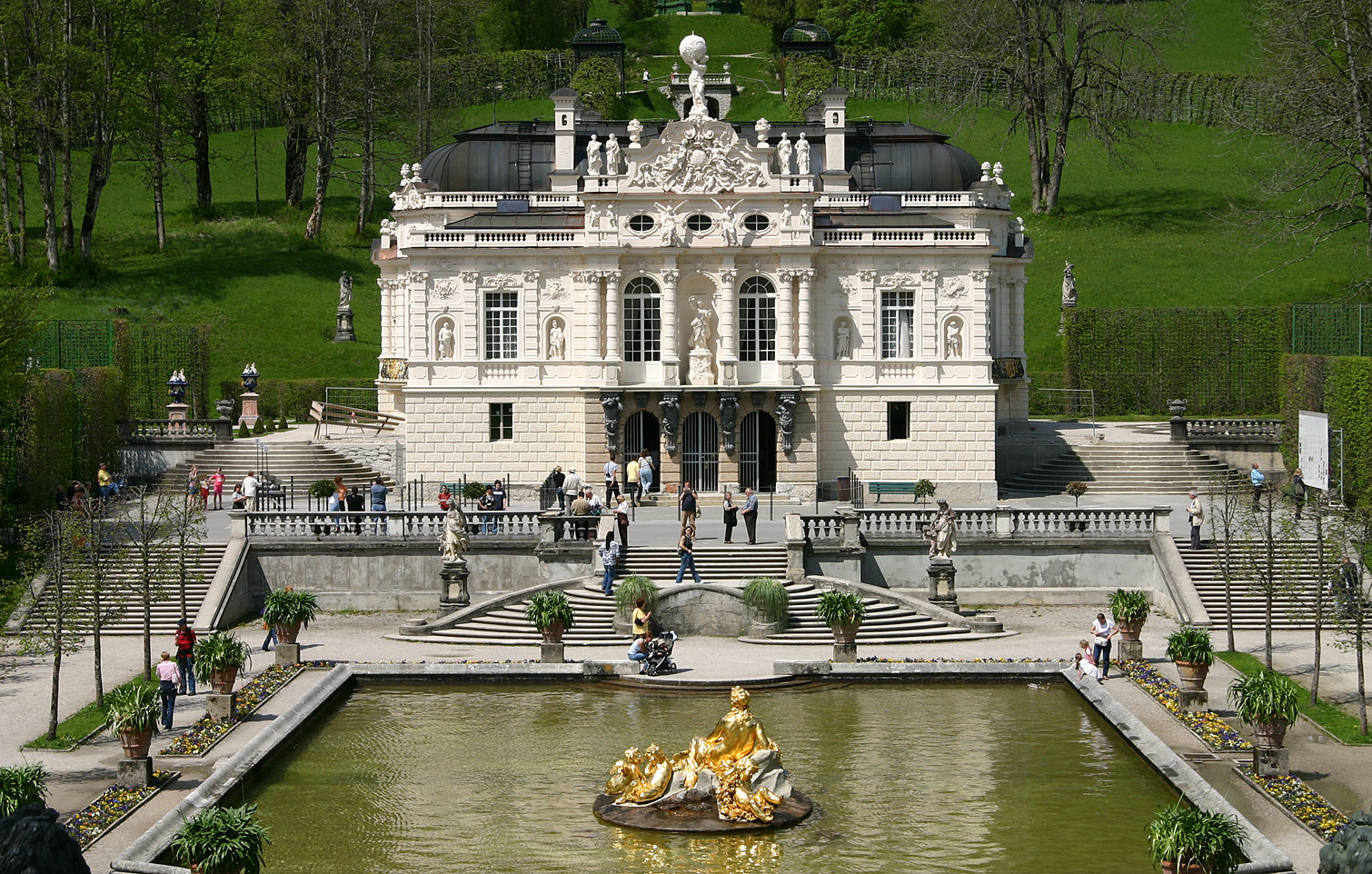
Linderhof Palace, built 1874–1879

Georg von Dollmann (1830–1895) was a German architect and Bavarian government building officer.

== Career ==
Georg von Dollmann was born on 21 October 1830 in Ansbach as Georg Carl Heinrich Dollmann. The son of a government officer, he attended the Gymnasium in Ansbach. In 1846 he moved to Munich and received his technical and artistic education at the Polytechnical Institute and the Academy of Fine Arts. In 1854 he entered the service of the Royal Bavarian State Railways, where he was concerned with building construction such as the modification of the station in Gemünden am Main. Leo von Klenze made him his assistant, and he worked in Klenze's office up to Klenze's death in 1864.

== Concept of a magnificent building ==
Dollmann completed the Befreiungshalle and expanded the Assyrian Hall in the Glyptothek courtyard. His first significant independent work was the neo-Gothic Church of the Holy Cross in Giesing (now part of Munich), which was built 1866–1883.

The concept of a magnificent building commissioned by King Maximilian II of Bavaria was not realized, but in 1868 he entered the service of his son King Ludwig II as an architect and saw a rapid career.

In 1869/1870, in five separate planning phases he designed the project of a Byzantine palace; however it was never realized. Between 1870 and 1872 he expanded the hunting house in Linderhof by a U-shaped building complex, whose centre was the stately bedroom. But this construction had to make place for a new Linderhof Palace, built 1874-1879.

From 1868 Ludwig II commissioned a project for a new Versailles Palace in Linderhof Valley. From December 1868 till September 1873, Dollmann presented seventeen different floor plans and numerous front elevations as well as many drawings of the bedroom. In 1873 the project was transferred to the Herreninsel in Chiemsee. As Herrenchiemsee Palace it remains uncompleted.

The King's House on Schachen, a wooden post-and-beam construction, was built 1869-1872. In 1874, Dollmann took over the direction of the building activities at Neuschwanstein Castle from Eduard Riedel starting in 1869.

In 1884 Dollmann fell from the king's favour. He had to make place for his colleague Julius Hofmann and retired. His wife Eugenie Félicité Sophie Dollmann, a granddaughter of Klenze, died in 1894. On 31 March 1895 Georg von Dollmann himself died in Munich.
