= Schwansee =

Lake in Bavaria, Germany

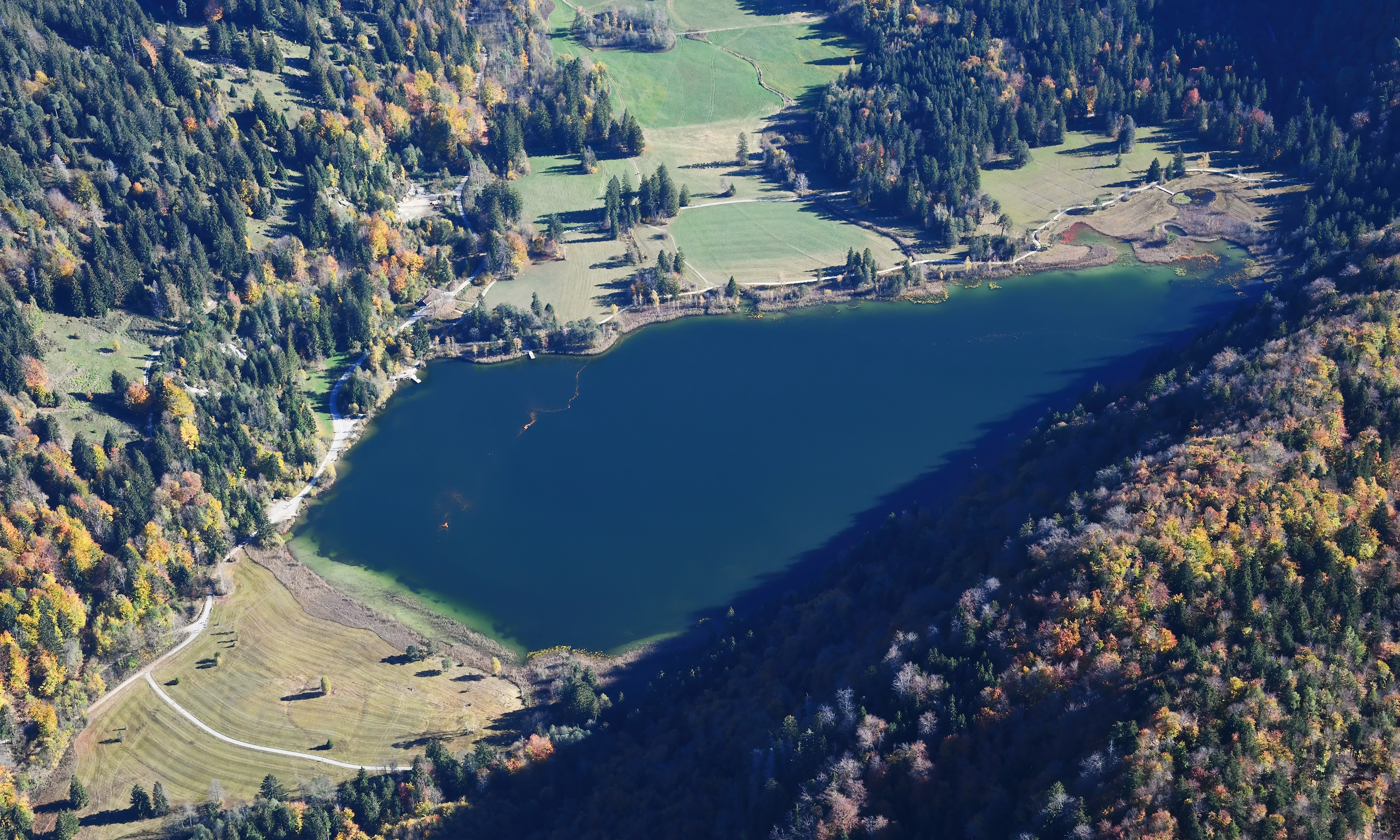

- Location within Bavaria
- Location: Swabia, Bavaria
- Coordinates: 47°33′27″N 10°43′11″E
- Primary outflows: Wassertal-Graben
- Basin countries: Germany
- Max. length: 650 m (2,130 ft)
- Max. width: 270 m (890 ft)
- Surface area: 17 ha (42 acres)
- Average depth: 3.41 m (11.2 ft)
- Max. depth: 7.10 m (23.3 ft)
- Water volume: 580,000 m^{3} (20,000,000 cu ft)
- Shore length^{1}: 1.7 km (1.1 mi)
- Surface elevation: 789.23 m (2,589.3 ft)
- ^{1} Shore length is not a well-defined measure.

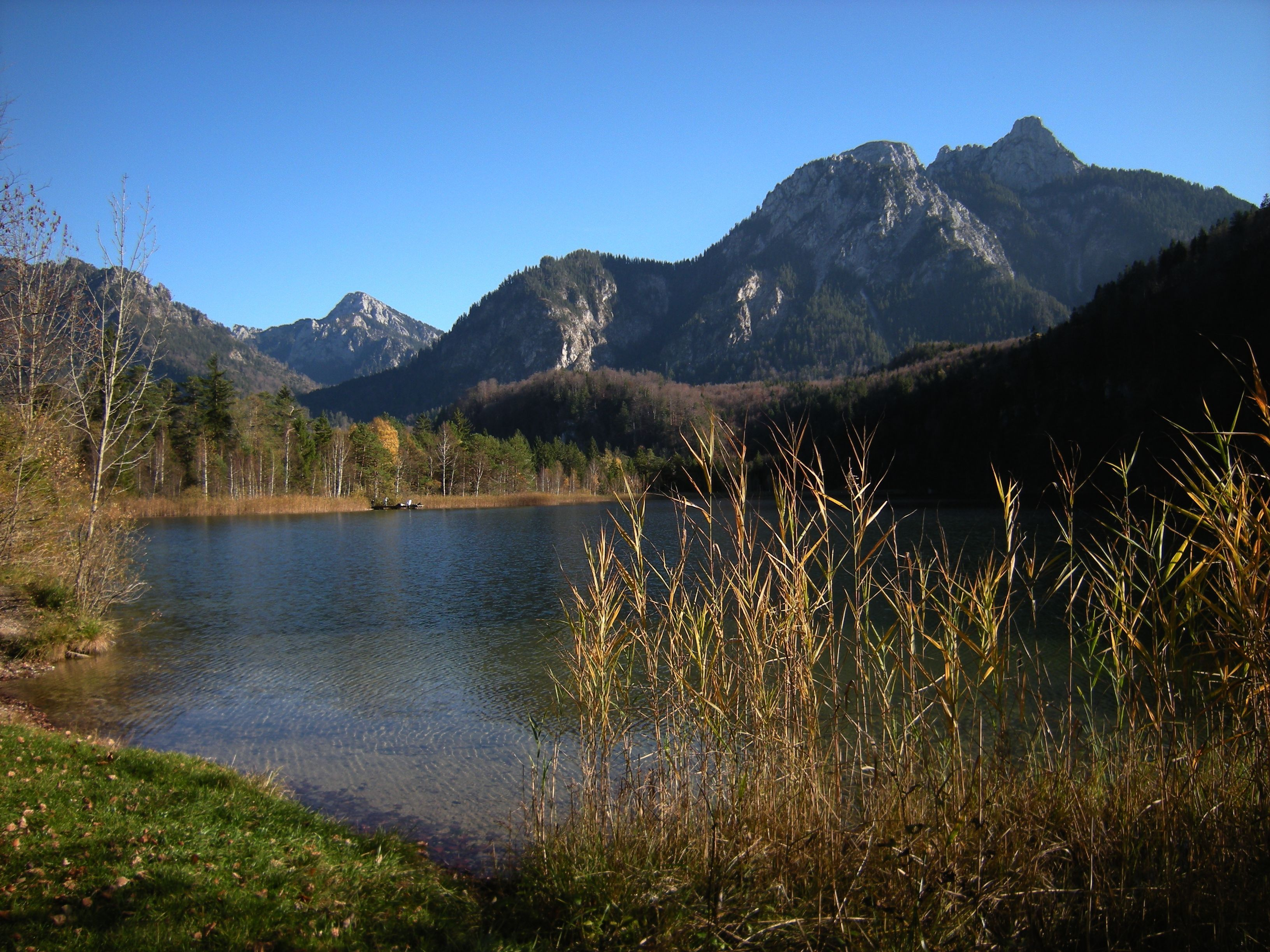

Schwansee (German pronunciation: [ˈʃvaːnzeː]) is a lake in Swabia, Bavaria, Germany. At an elevation of 789,23 m, its surface area is 17 ha (42 acres).
