= Forggensee =

Lake in Ostallgäu, Bavaria, Germany

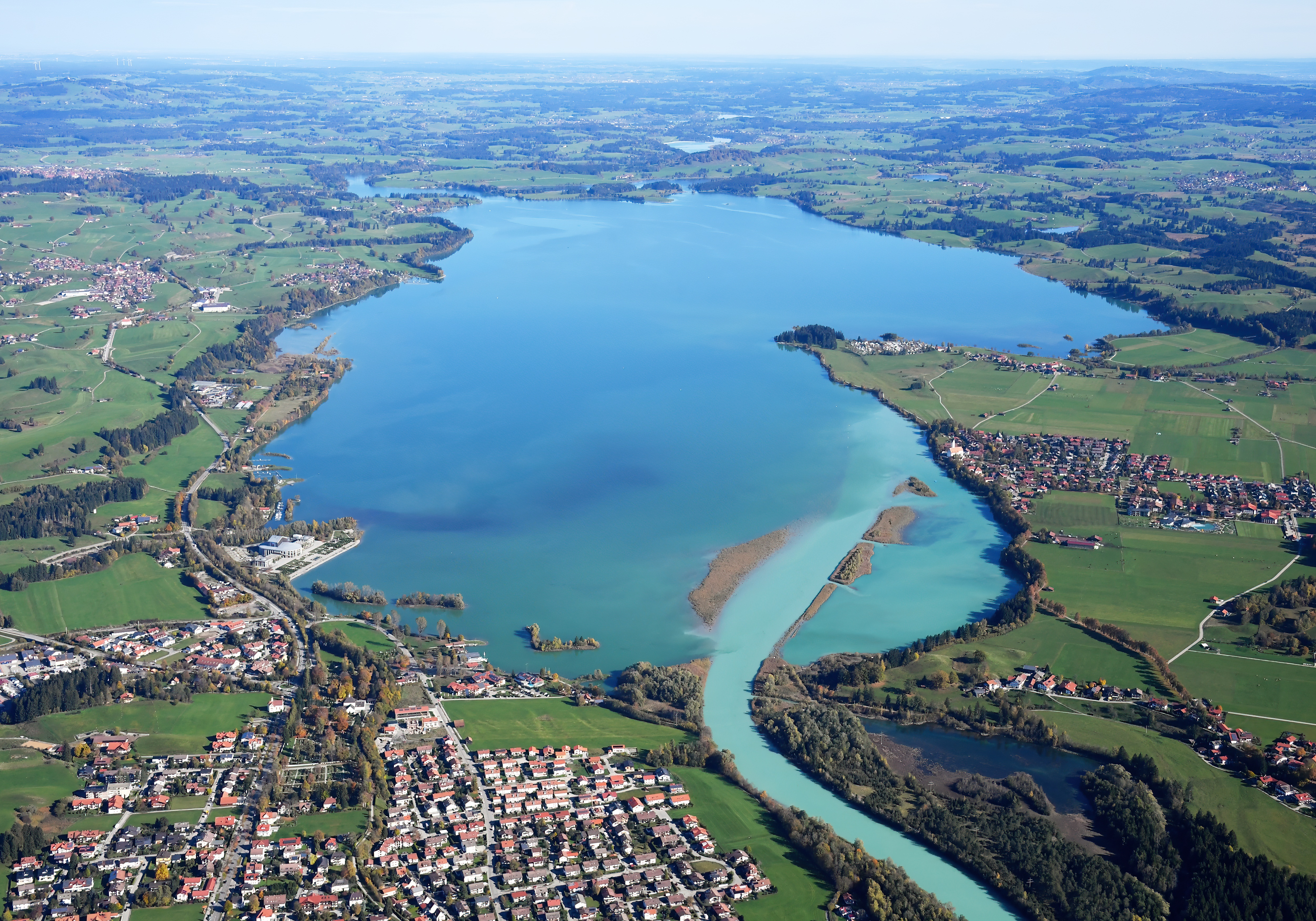
- Aerial view of the Forggensee
- Interactive map of Forggensee
- Location: Ostallgäu
- Construction began: 1950–1954

Dam and spillways
- Impounds: Lech, Füssener Ache, Mühlberger Ache
- Height (foundation): 41 m
- Height (thalweg): 37 m
- Length: 320 m (1,050 ft)
- Elevation at crest: 785 m above sea level (NHN)
- Width (crest): 10 m
- Dam volume: 650,000 m^{3}

Reservoir
- Active capacity: 168 Mm^{3}
- Catchment area: 1,594 km^{2}
- Surface area: 15.2 km^{2}
- Maximum length: 8.7 km
- Maximum width: 2.8 km
- Normal elevation: 780.5 m above sea level (NHN)

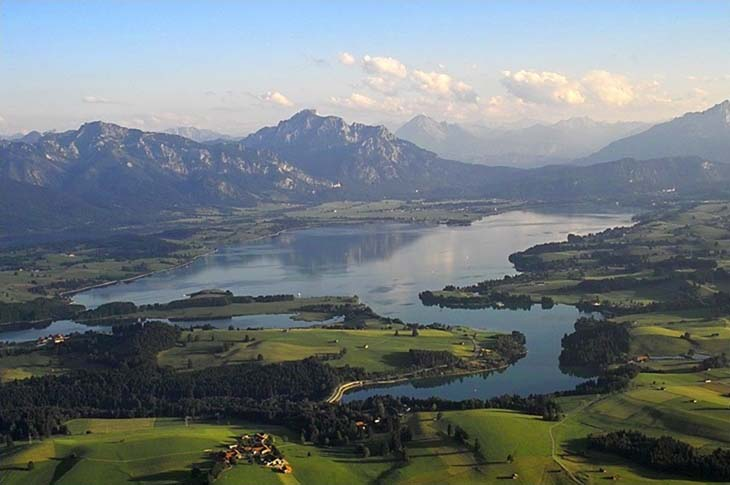
The Forggensee from the north. In the background are the Tegelberg, Säuling, Thaneller and Tannheim Mountains, Neuschwanstein Castle may be seen in the foothills to the left; to the right is Füssen

The Forggensee, also called the Roßhaupten Reservoir, is a reservoir located north of Füssen in the county of Ostallgäu in Bavaria, Germany and one of many lakes in the region around Hohenschwangau and Neuschwanstein castles. With a surface area of 15.2 km^{2}, it is the fifth-largest lake in Bavaria and the largest reservoir in Germany by area. The River Lech flows through it. The Forggensee is known primarily as a tourist destination for aquatic sports and recreation. Besides Füssen, other settlements on the lake include Halblech, Rieden am Forggensee and Roßhaupten. The lake takes its name from the former hamlet of Forggen which has been submerged by the reservoir.

== Origin ==
Following the climax of the last ice age, the Lech-Wertach foreland glacier, which covered the entire Ostallgäu, gradually melted back from its maximum extent at Kaufbeuren. In the course of its retreat, as in the entire Pre-Alpine area, new morainic ridges were formed from the masses of debris carried by the ice from the mountains piled up at the edge of the glacial tongue whenever the glacier halted temporarily or advanced briefly again. These ridges can still be seen in today's landscape.

=== Lake Füssen ===
Even though the Forggensee is not a natural lake today, it is located in a basin that was filled by a much larger lake after the last ice age: when after the Würm Ice Age, the Lech Glacier continued to melt, initially forming large masses of dead ice, after which lakes formed in the basins.

North of the Lech Waterfall was one of these glacial lakes, Lake Füssen (Füssener See), a waterbody with an area of 60 km^{2} whose surface lay at a height of 790 m above NHN, which was formed as water levels rose behind the ridge (tectonically formed sediments of the molasse, which exhibit greater resistant to erosion than the rocks of the Cretaceous Flysch zone adjoining them to the south) at the southern end of the Murnau Depression at the northern end of the present-day Forggensee.

This lake may be viewed as the forerunner of the Forggensee and the smaller Pre-Alpine lakes in this region, most of which have survived. The foothills of the Alps were finally free of ice around 14,500 years ago.

=== Silting up of Lake Füssen ===
The resulting lake basins were filled with clay and silt deposits from glacial meltwaters in a relatively short time. Lake Füssen also visibly silted up, but it also flowed out through the Illasberg Gorge, which the River Lech gradually carved out through the southern wing of the Murnau Depression near today's barrage no. 1 at Roßhaupten. In this gorge, the Lech cuts through the steep strata of the tertiary Lower Marine Molasse and the Lower Freshwater Molasse (Tertiary), from south to north these are the strata of the Deutenhausen Formation, the clay marl strata, the rock strata and in particular the Weißach strata of the Lower Freshwater Molasse (Illasberg, Zwieselberg, Senkele).

Only small lakes in the hollows of the former lake bed have survived: the Bannwald-, Hopfen-, Schwansee and Weißensee. The Alpsee, on the other hand, was always an independent lake. A magnificent wild river landscape developed in the Lech Valley, the Lechauen, whose river arms, gravel banks, and extensive floodplains were habitats for a rich fauna and flora; so the red deer that came down from the mountains wintered there.

=== Reservoir ===
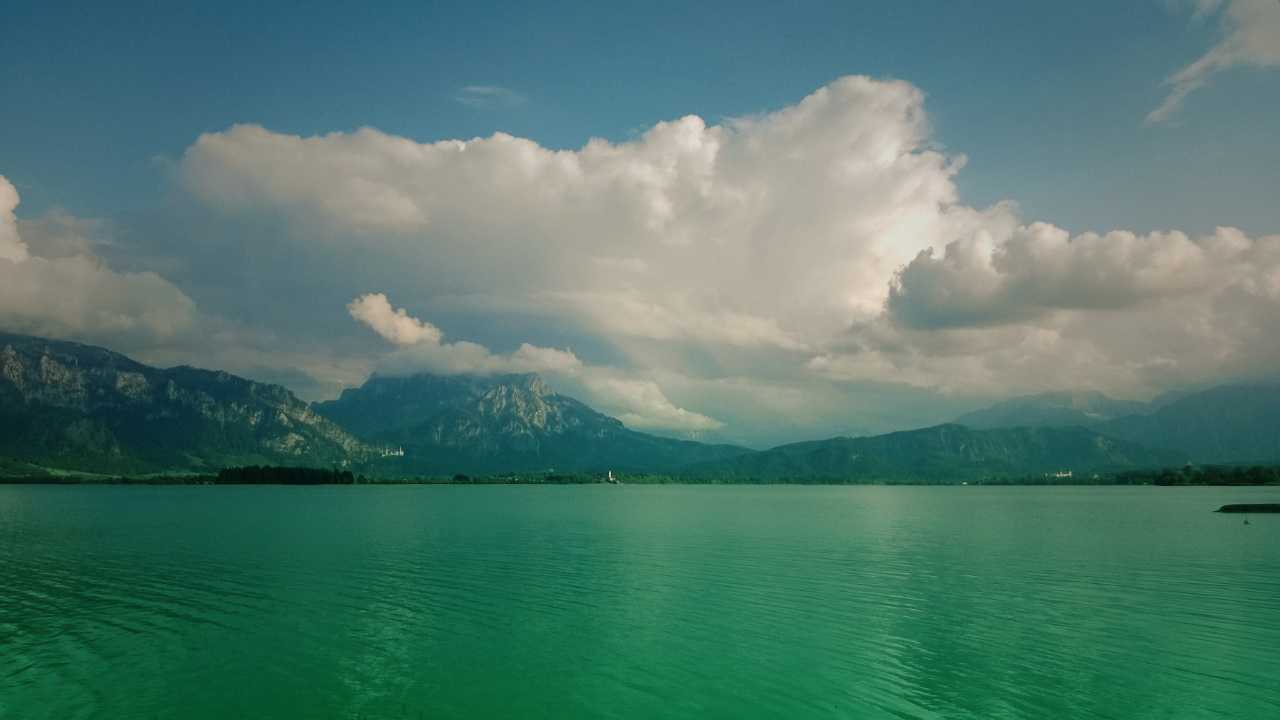
Forggensee

The first plans for using the hydroelectric power available near Roßhaupten were made at the end of the 19th century. In 1898, Siemens & Halske bought the first plots of land in the area of the Lech water gap near Roßhaupten and received a licence to build a hydroelectric power plant, which, however, expired in 1907.

In 1910, the "Royal Supreme Construction Authority" (Königliche Oberste Baubehörde) published a memorandum on the utilization of water power on the Lech, according to which a dam with a height of 34 m, a crown length of 140 m and a total capacity of 65 million m^{3} was to be built. The First World War and economically difficult post-war years prevented the realisation of this project.

The increasing demand for electricity in the interwar period aroused renewed interest in building a Lech storage reservoir. A draft paper from 1936/37 envisaged a storage target of 784 m above NHN, i.e. three meters higher than later, and a concrete dam with a built-in power plant.

In 1940, the Bavarian Hydropower Works (Bayerische Wasserkraftwerke or BAWAG) was founded to build hydropower stations on the Lech, the Lower Isar, and the Upper Danube. Due to the long construction period of the war years, the planned start of construction of the Roßhaupten Reservoir was postponed. Only the Lech levels 7 to 15 between Landsberg and Schongau could be built in the years 1940 to 1950 - the smaller plants could be built faster.

After the end of the Second World War, the Lech reservoir project was resumed. After tough negotiations, the storage target was set at 781 m above NHN - the originally planned storage height of 784 m above NHN would have resulted in larger resettlements of 1,500 to 2,000 people and, especially in the area around Schwangau, significant loss of agricultural land. The 1999 Pentecost flood gave an impression of the scale of this when the lake level on 22 May 1999 at 782.91 m above NHN was just over a metre lower than the originally planned water level.

BAWAG, meanwhile only responsible for expanding the Lech dams, began building the Lech Reservoir in 1950. This led to strong protests from the residents, who founded a protective association and reached a largely satisfactory agreement with BAWAG in the 1952 Schwangau Agreement. For those affected, either new farms could be found nearby or new houses were built. Above all, many of the farmers and their descendants who lived in what is now the Forggensee area can still be found in the surrounding communities today. Construction of the dam began in early 1951 after new access roads and a residential camp for up to 1,000 workers had been built. To ensure the dam structure was watertight, the entire dam and its associated structures were built directly on rock; For geological reasons, this did not happen directly at the breakthrough of the Lech through the Illa's Gorge as originally planned, but about a kilometre downstream, so that the ecologically valuable gorge was lost in the process. On the lakeside, a five-meter-thick concrete apron was installed up to 20 meters deep into the rock. In the spring of 1952, the Lech was dammed here and diverted through a tunnel that had been built in the meantime. In the remaining two years until its completion at the end of 1954, the remaining structures were built and the dam was flooded. The building materials were largely obtained from the reservoir itself.

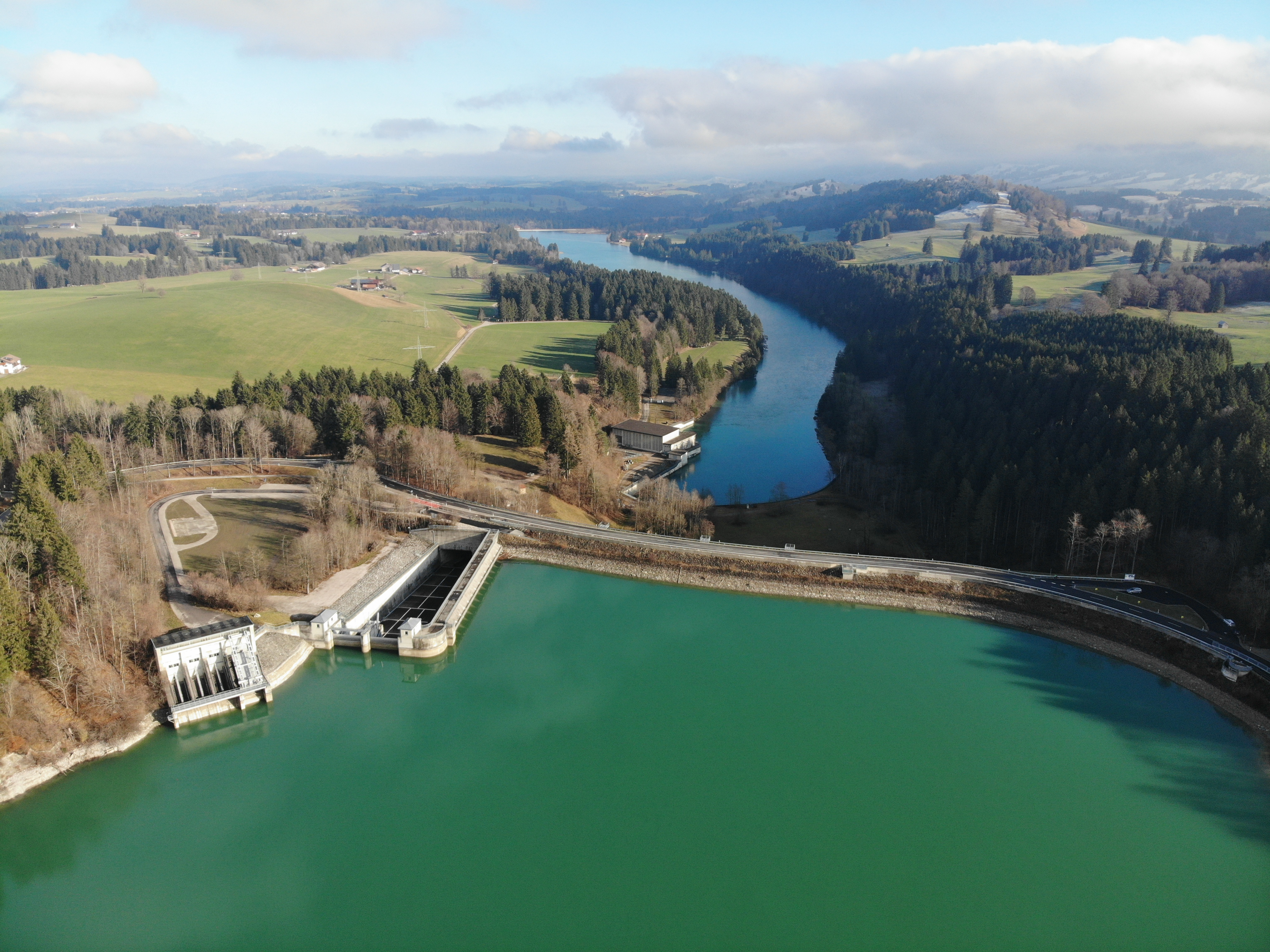
Forggensee Dam from the west aerial view (2019)

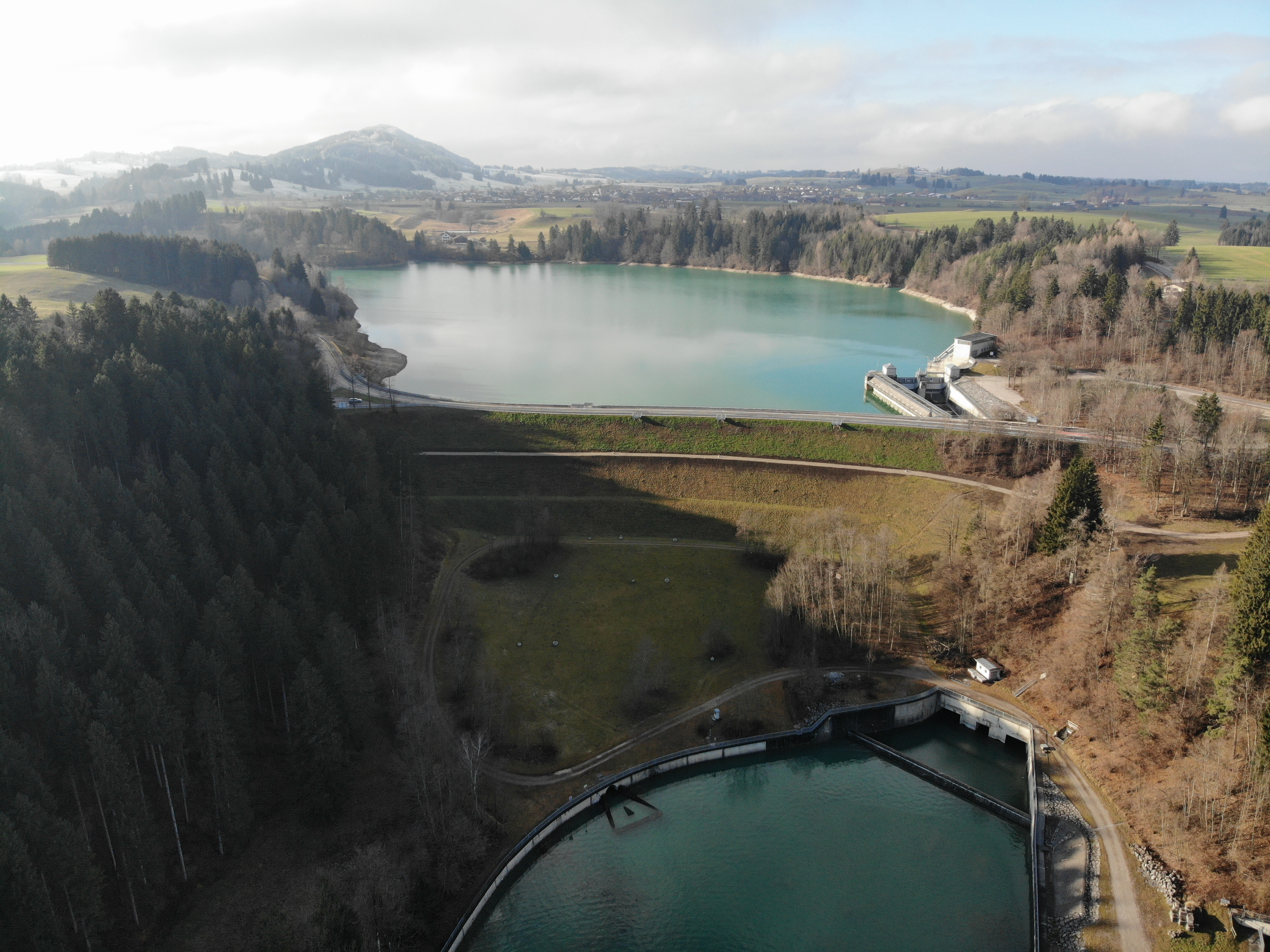
Forggensee Dam from the east aerial view (2019)

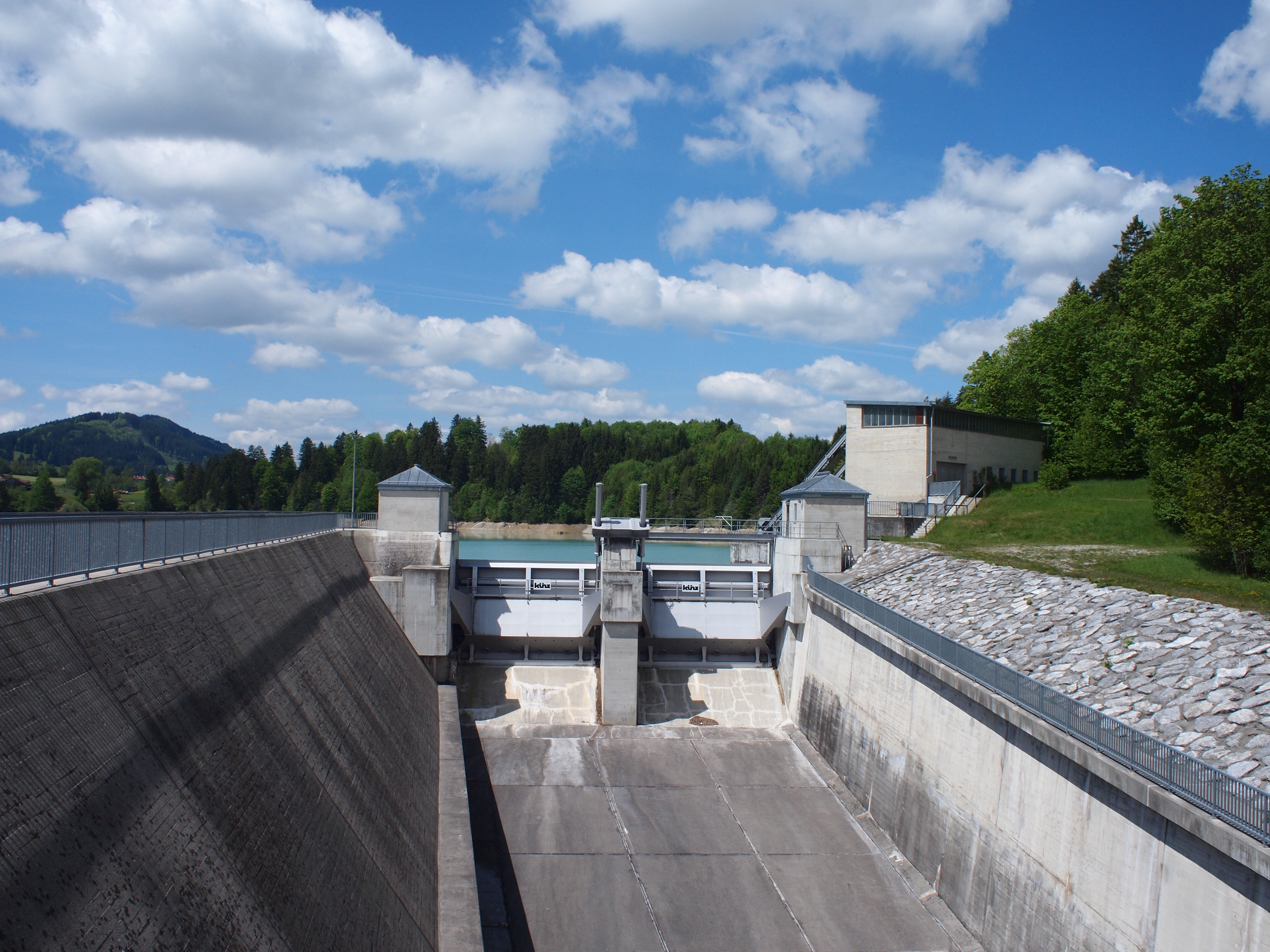
Forggensee overflow

Lech-Füssen area in Roman times.

The Roßhaupten Dam was renovated in 2018, which is why the lake was not filled in 2018 (as it is every spring). In 2019 the lake was reflooded.

=== Conservation and archaeology ===
Altogether 32 residential buildings with 256 inhabitants (1950) from the Schwangau villages Brunnen, Deutenhausen and Forggen, including 16 farms with 800 hectares of land east of the Lech were impacted by the flooding of Lake Forggen in 1954. On the west bank, the lower Osterreinen on the old road was demolished as were individual buildings near Dürracker and Füssen; the Lower Weidachsiedlung near today's Füssen district of Weidach was completely relocated, 32 families having to leave their homes. Of the affected buildings, only 14 houses from Deutenhausen survived: They were bought by Bavarian Hydropower in 1952 from Theodor Momm, the owner of the spinning mill of the same name in Kaufbeuren, demolished in the fall of 1954, and rebuilt by expellees in the area. Figures of saints from the Deutenhausen chapel, on the other hand, are now in St. Coloman near Schwangau.

The former episcopal mill, which was moved from Waltenhofen to Forggen in 1644, was probably the most important building among the larger individual farms; today its foundation walls are crumbling on the lake bed.

At the northern end of the lake, the Dösinger local researcher Sigulf Guggenmos (1941–2018) discovered various important archaeological sites, including traces of Mesolithic hunting stations and a Late Celtic or Roman place of sacrifice.

A few hundred metres from today's shore, on the former path from Brunnen to Forggen, you will come across the foundation walls and brick remains of a Roman villa rustica that were cleared in 1974. Such manor houses supplied travellers on the Roman roads. According to the Bavarian State Office for Monument Protection, a solid road embankment that is still clearly visible there and aligned with the landmarks Auerberg in the north and Säuling in the south could be a Roman road that has fallen into oblivion, which perhaps represents a connection from the Roman settlement of Tegelberg to Via Claudia Augusta and its trading station at Osterreinen. It is, therefore, possible that an additional Roman road ran from Pinswang through the Alpsee saddle and via the Roman settlement on Tegelberg, which was used seasonally.

== Recreation ==
The lake provides ideal conditions for surfing, sailing, fishing, and boating. The lake is stocked with pike, trout and eel. Two ships navigate the lake on two different routes.

== Gallery ==
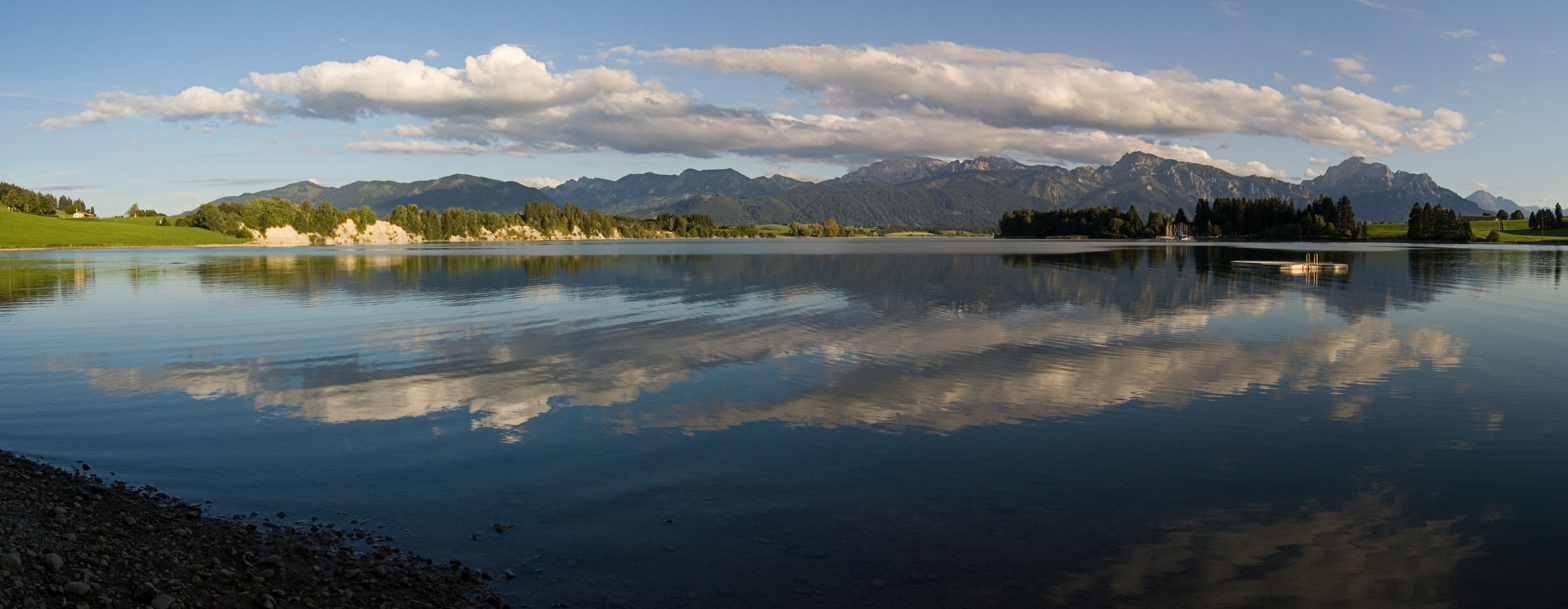
Northern end of the Forggensee with a view of the Illasberg Gorge
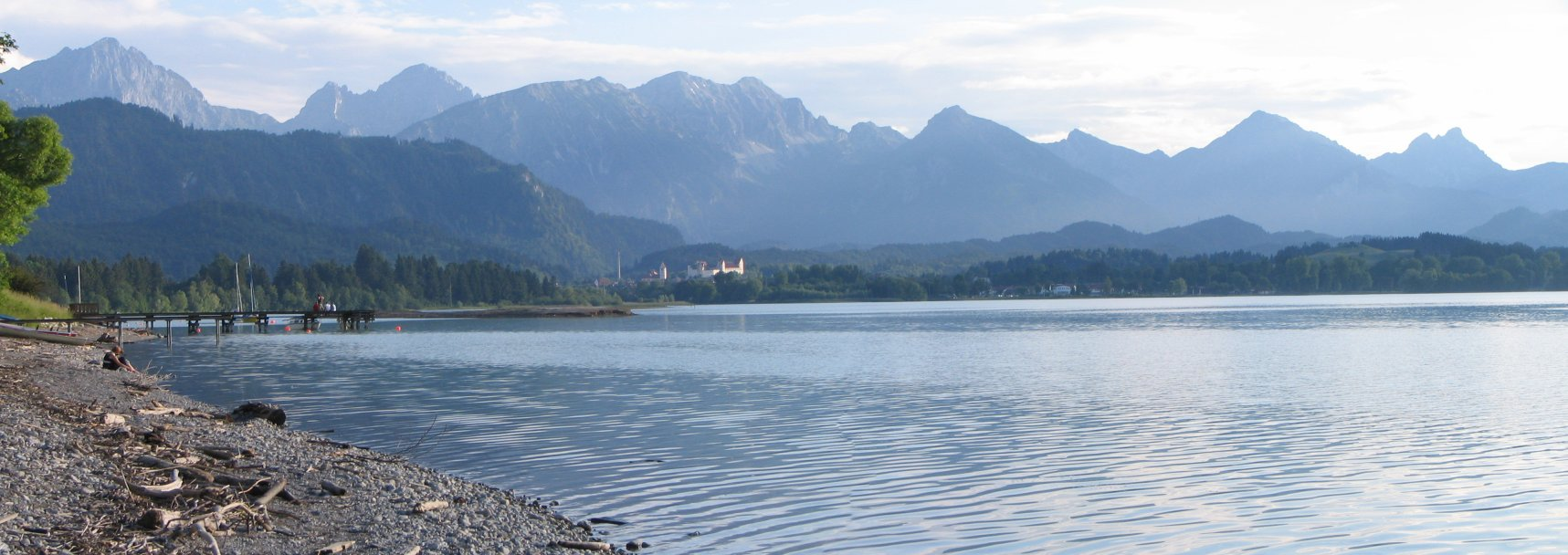
Southern end of the Forggensee with a view of Füssen
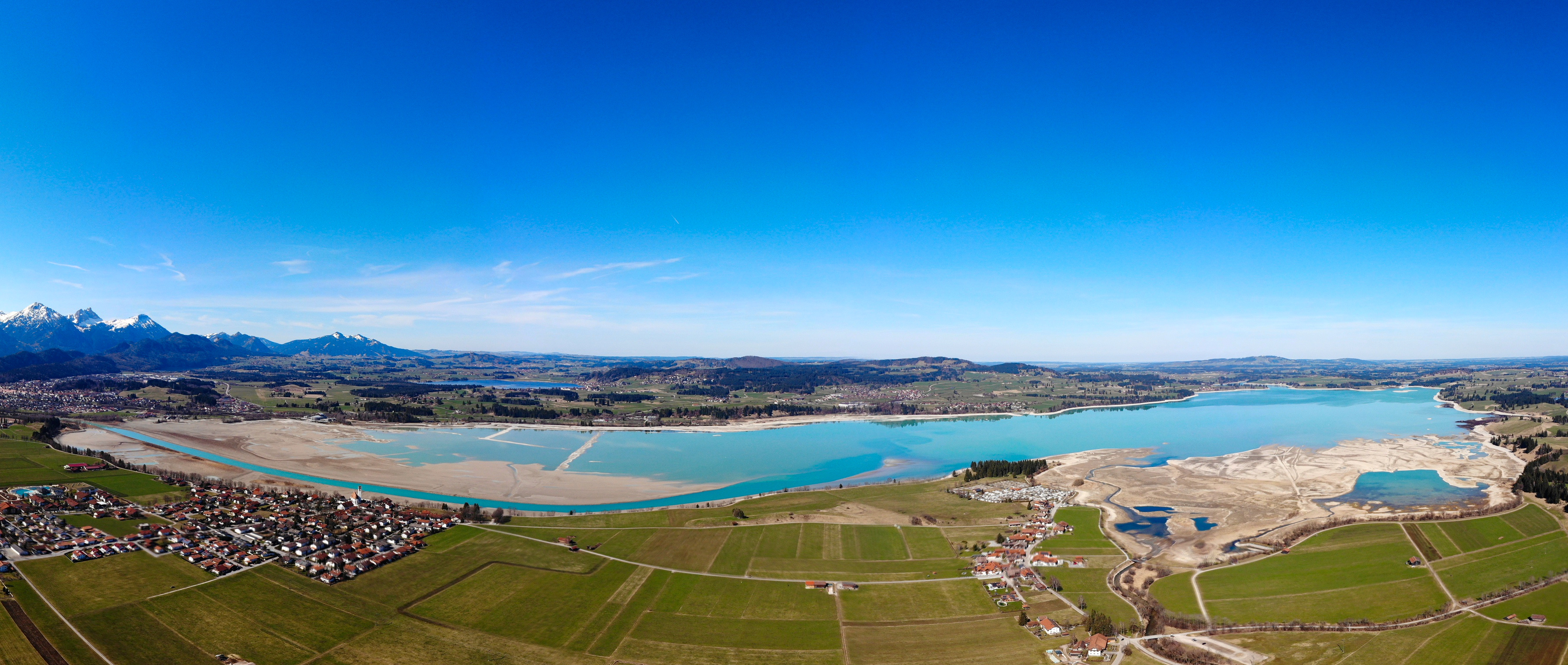
Aerial photograph of the Forggensee at low water from the SE (March 2020)

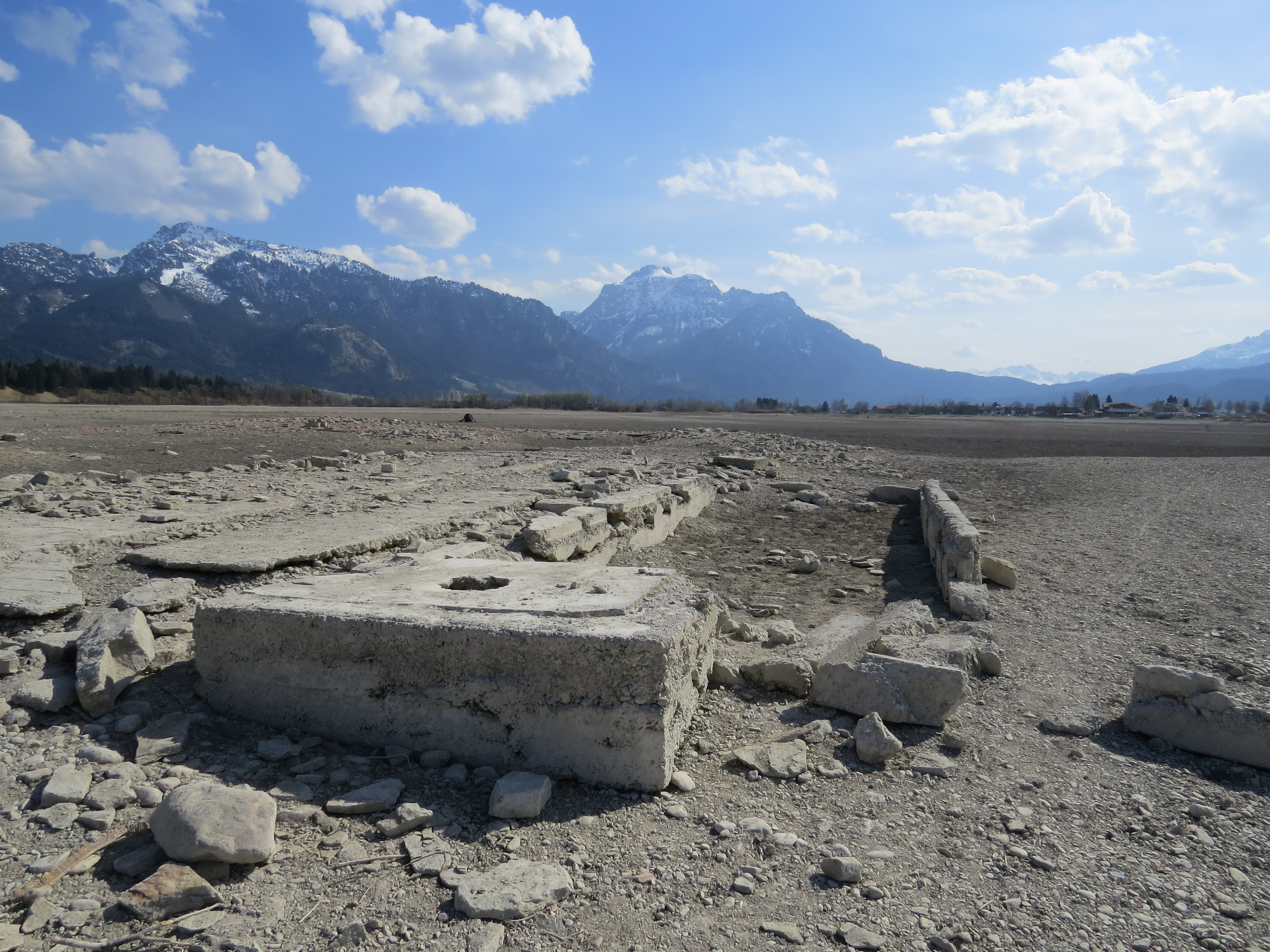
Remains of the hamlet of Forggen in the Forggensee

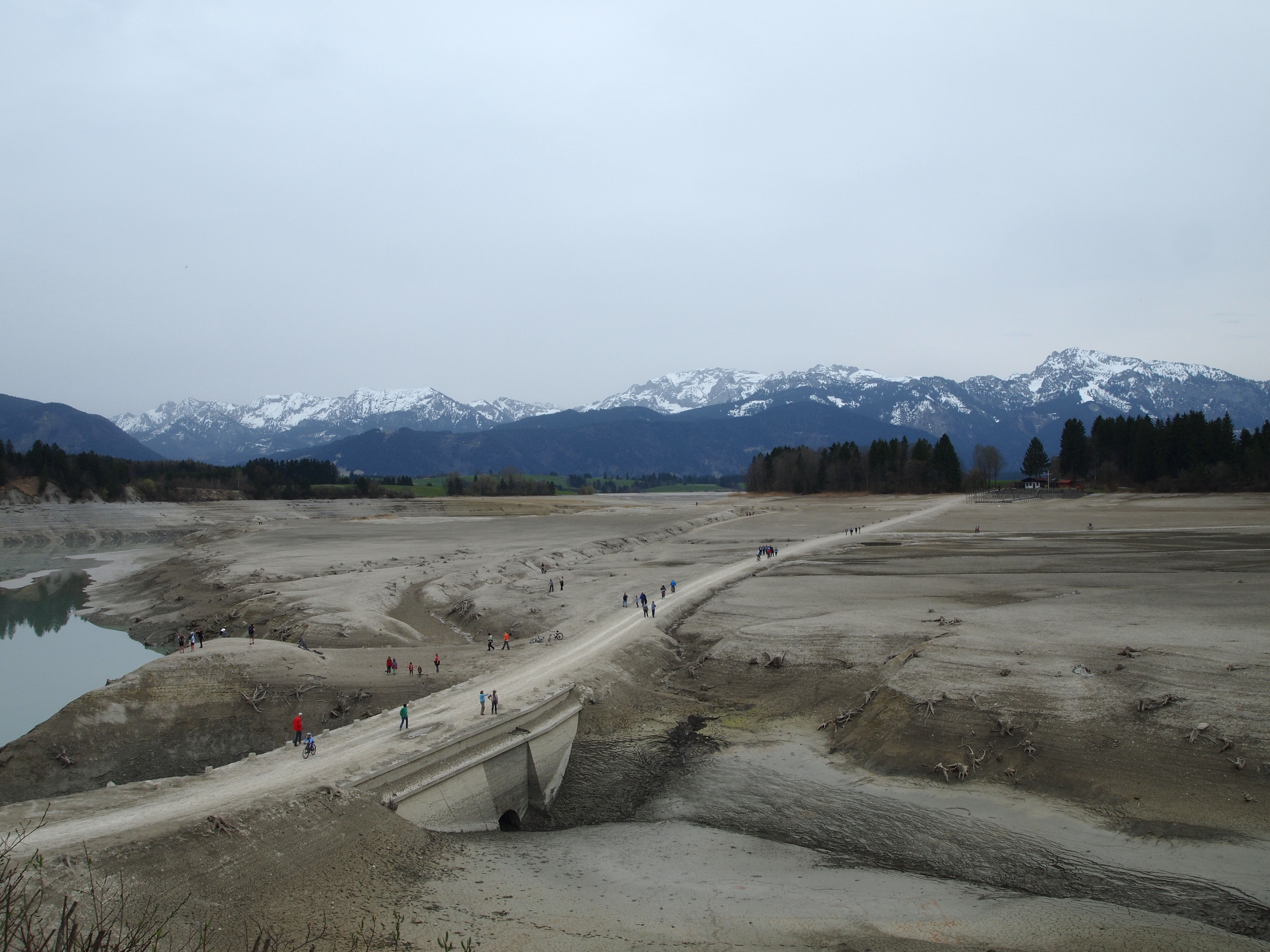
Tiefental Bridge of the former Bundesstraße

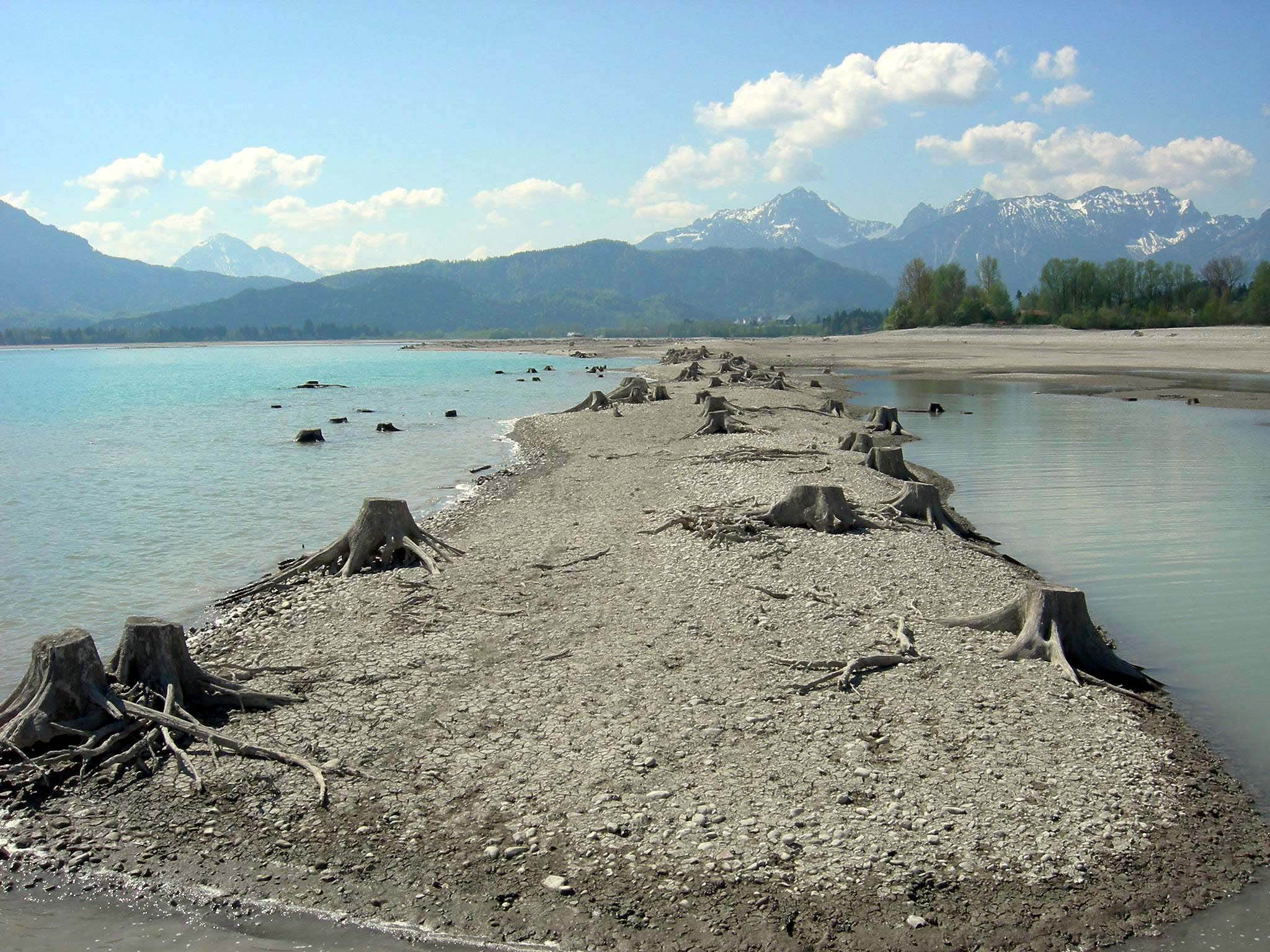
The Via Claudia Augusta between Rieden and Roßhaupten

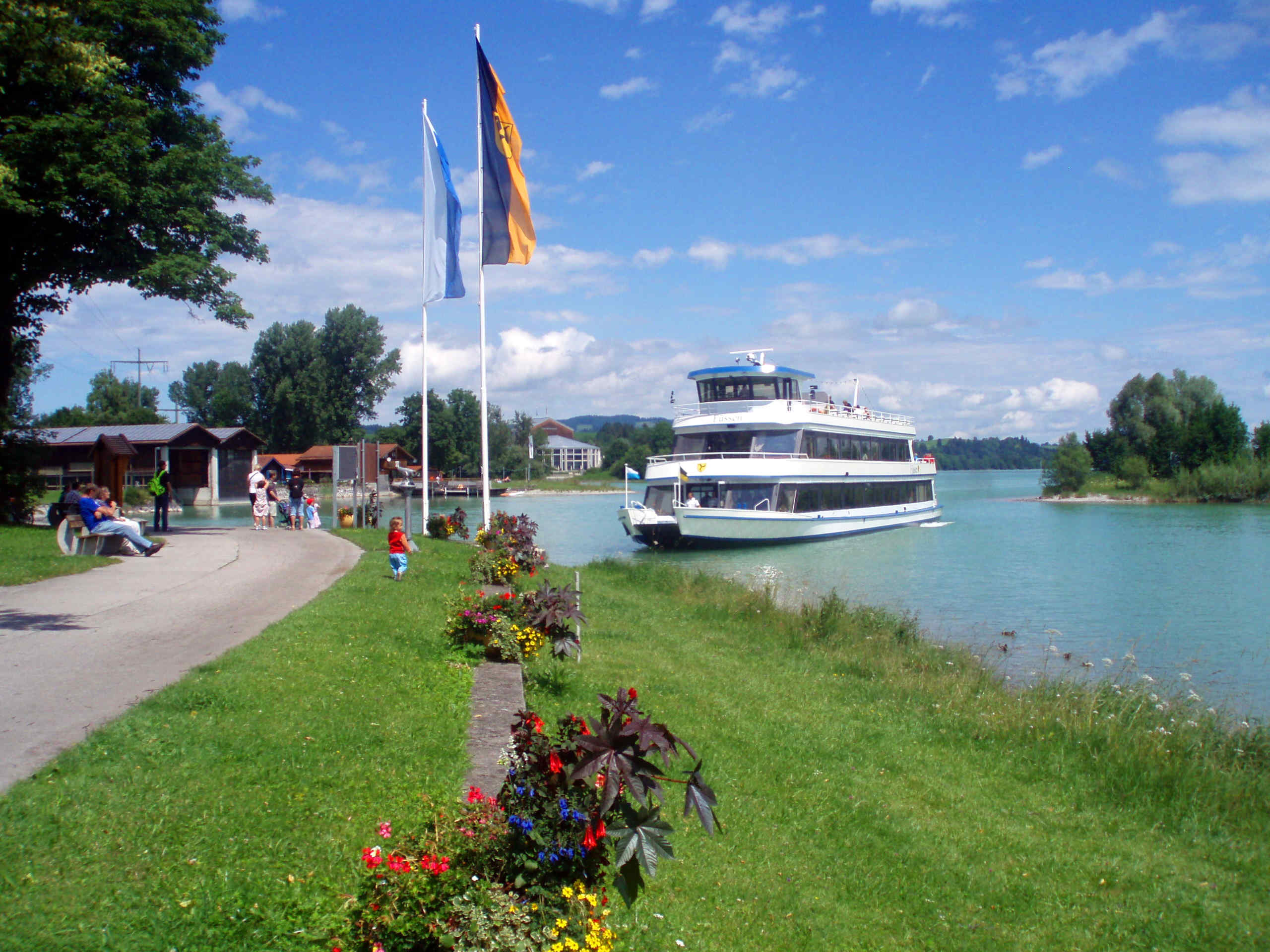
Boat landing stage at Füssen for the Forggen Navigation

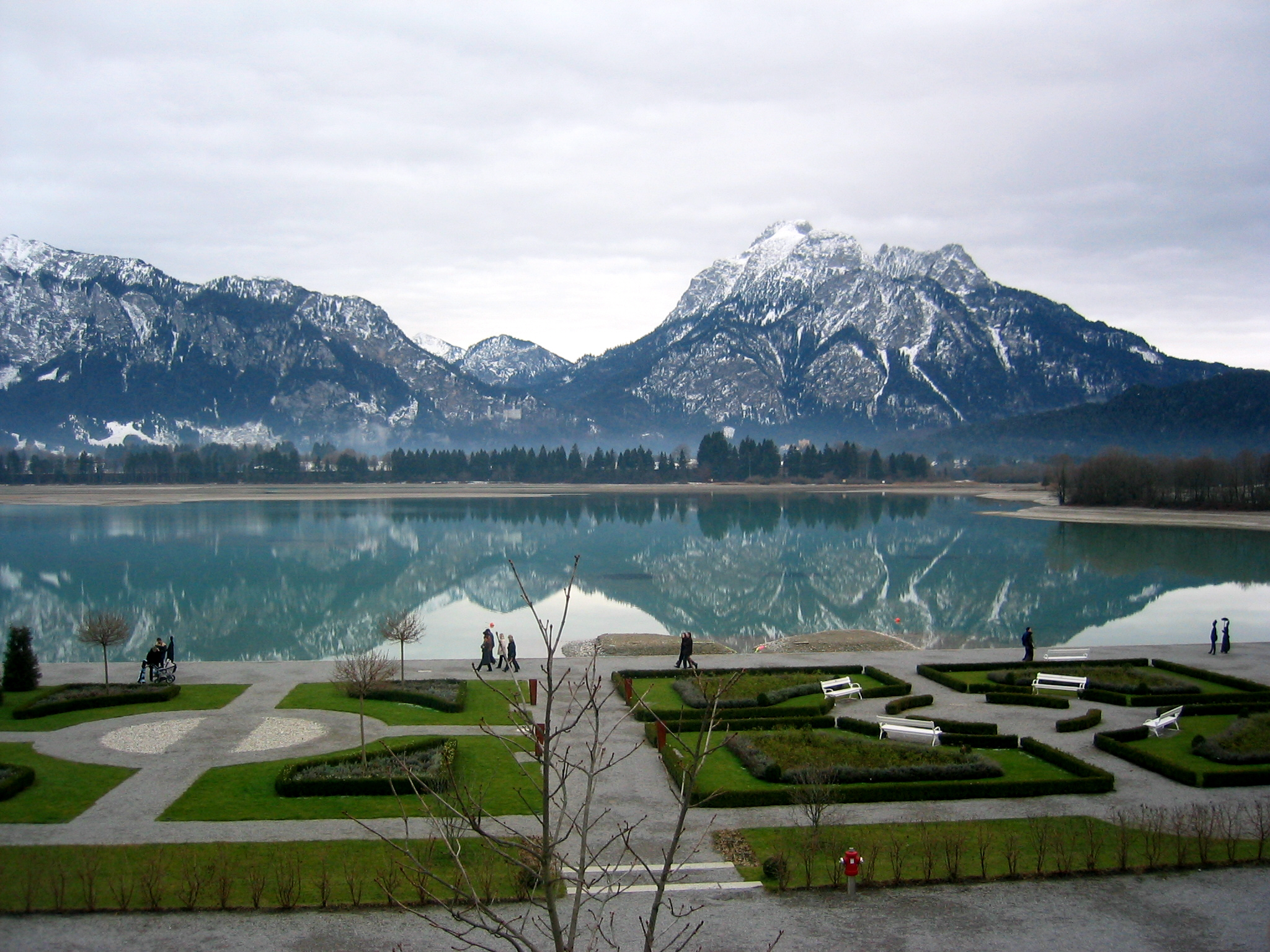
View from the terrace of the Neuschwanstein Music Theatre
