= Elmen =

Municipality in Tyrol, Austria

- Municipality
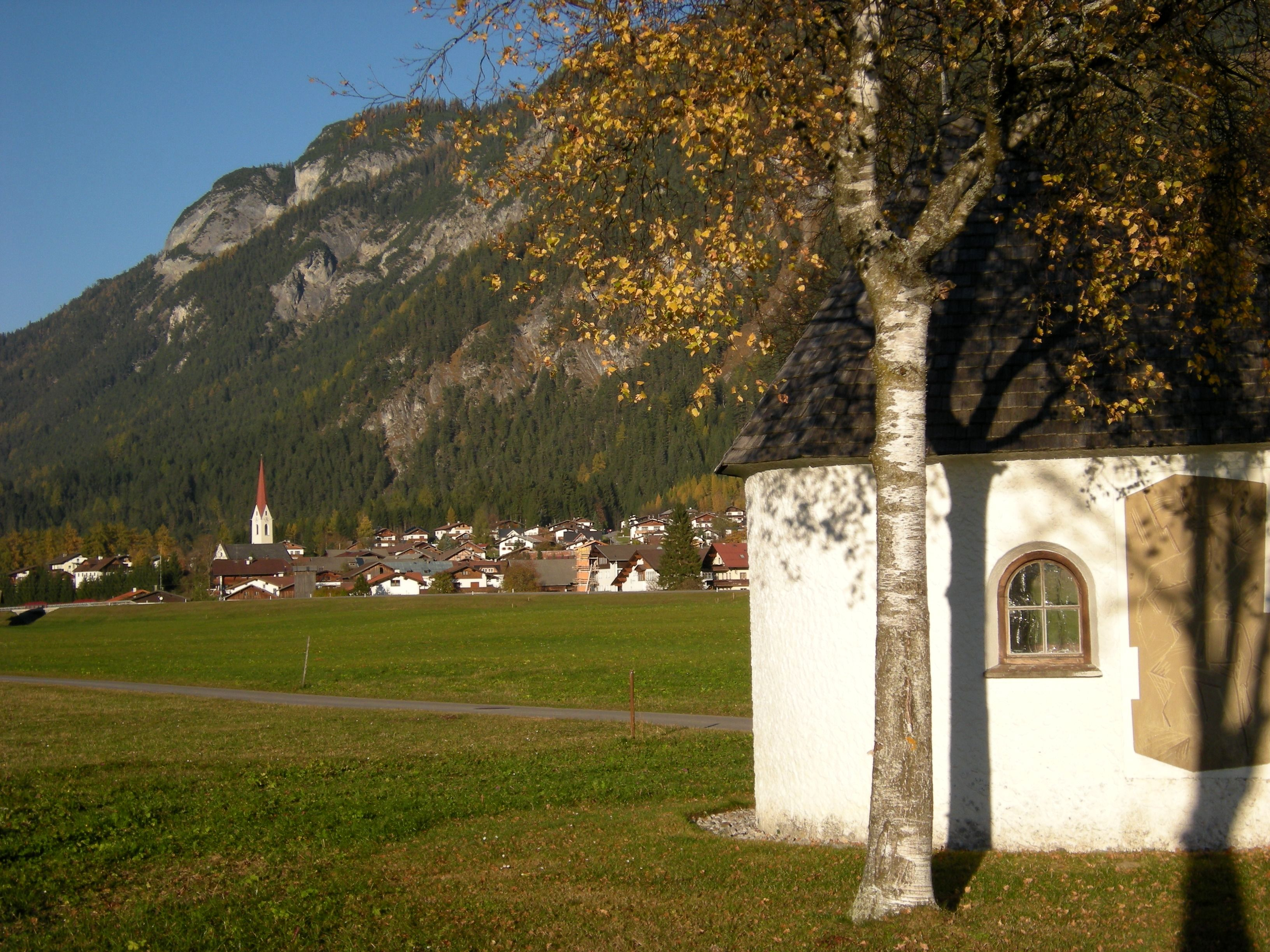

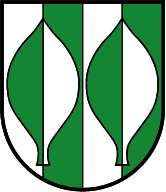
- Coat of arms

- Location within Austria
- Coordinates: 47°20′19″N 10°32′31″E
- Country: Austria
- State: Tyrol
- District: Reutte

Government
  - Mayor: Heinrich Ginther

Area
  - Total: 29.63 km^{2} (11.44 sq mi)
- Elevation: 976 m (3,202 ft)

Population (2021)
  - Total: 391
  - Density: 13.2/km^{2} (34.2/sq mi)
- Time zone: UTC+1 (CET)
  - Summer (DST): UTC+2 (CEST)
- Postal code: 6644
- Area code: 05635
- Vehicle registration: RE

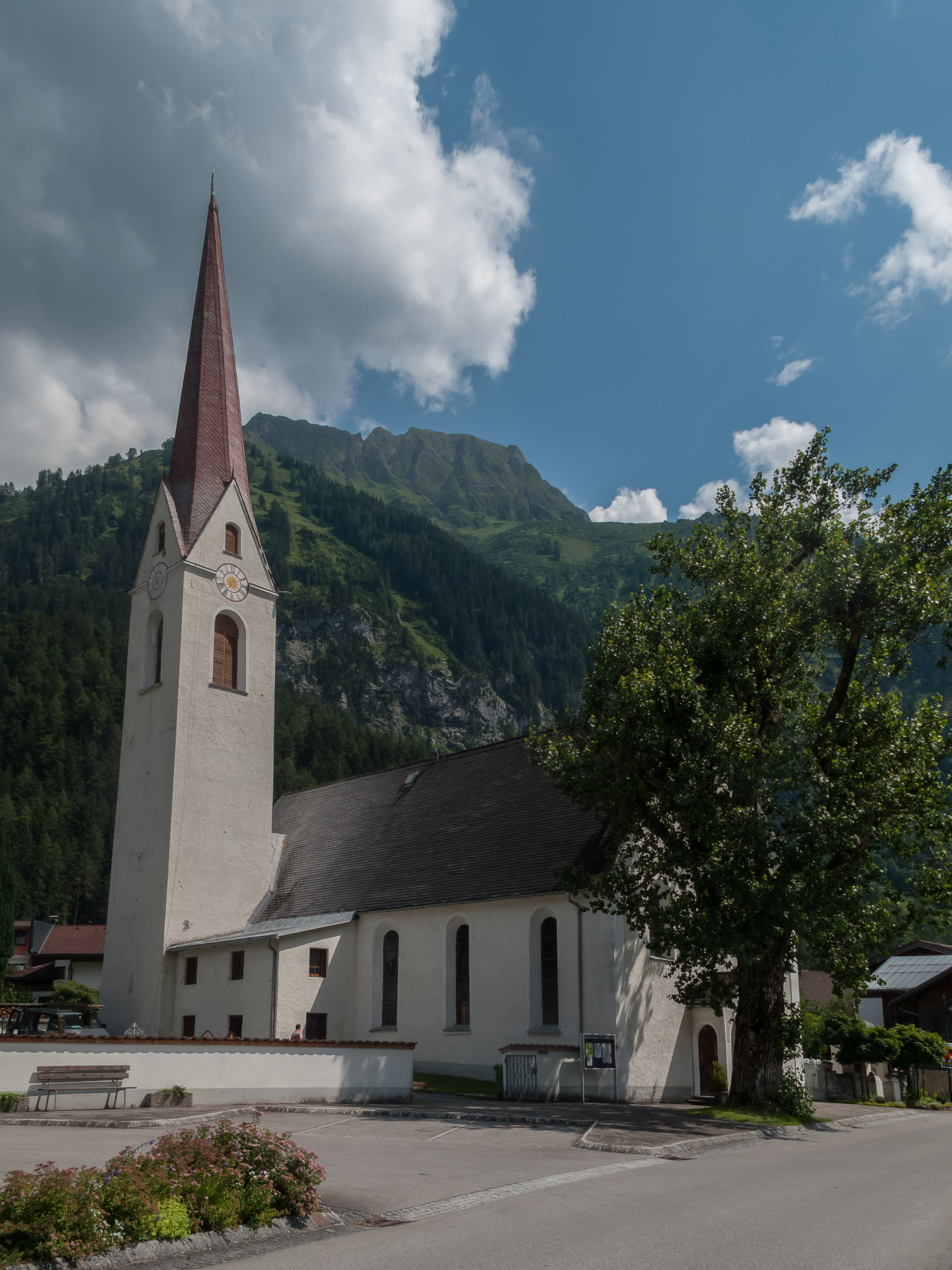
church: Pfarrkirche zu den Heiligen Drei Königen

Elmen is a municipality in the district of Reutte in the Austrian state of Tyrol.

== Geography ==
Elmen lies off the main road on the right bank of the Lech.
