= Lech (river) =

River in Austria and Germany

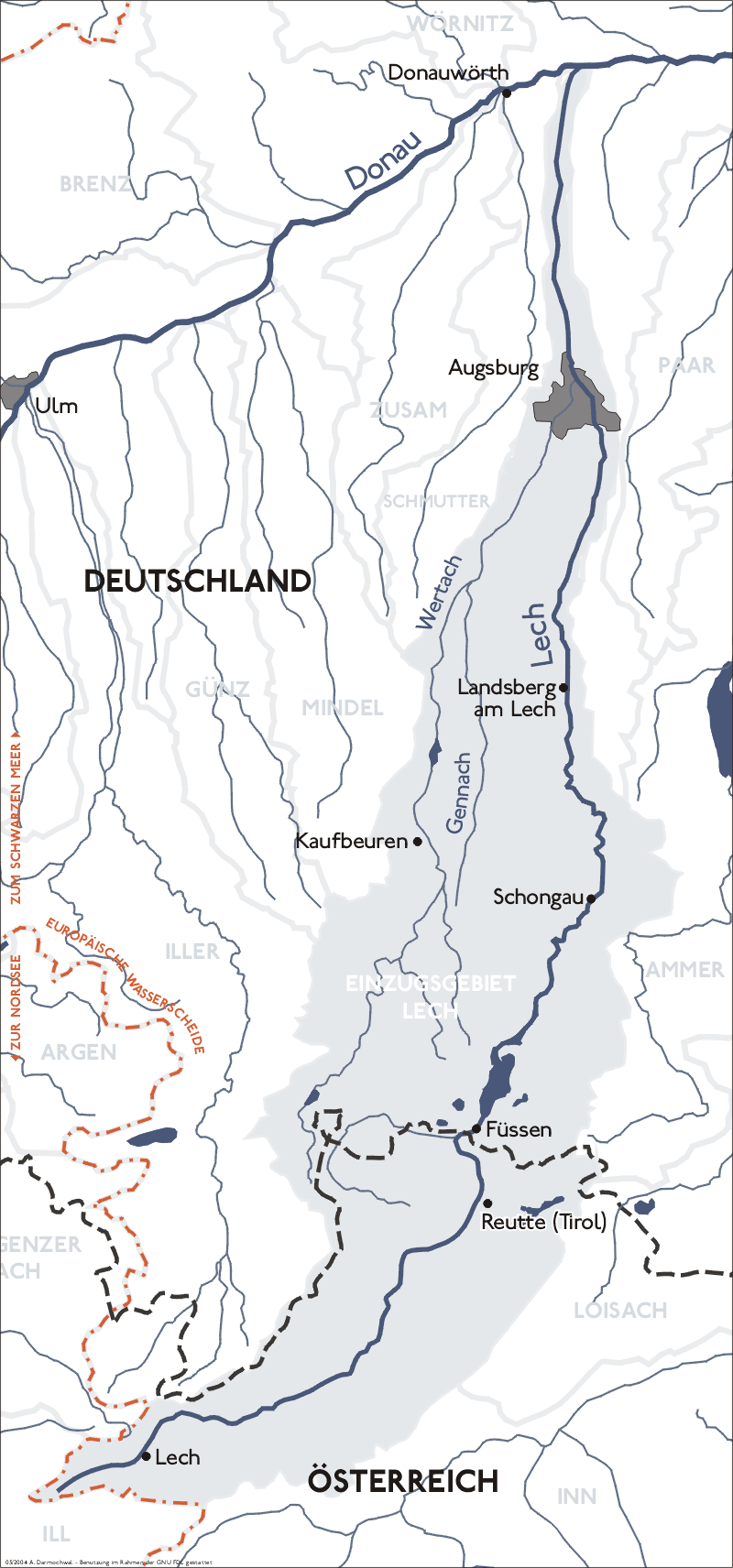
- Drainage basin of the Lech

Location
- Countries: Germany and Austria

Physical characteristics
- Source
  - location: Northern Limestone Alps
  - elevation: 1,865 metres (6,119 ft)
- Mouth
  - location: Danube
  - coordinates: 48°44′6″N 10°56′11″E
- Length: 255.3 km (158.6 mi)
- Basin size: 3,919 km^{2} (1,513 sq mi)
- Discharge
  - location: mouth
  - average: 115 m^{3}/s (4,100 cu ft/s)

Basin features
- Progression: Danube→ Black Sea

The Lech (German pronunciation: [lɛç]; Latin: Licus, Licca) is a river in Austria and Germany. It is a right tributary of the Danube 255 kilometres (158 mi) in length with a drainage basin of 3,919 square kilometres (1,513 sq mi). Its average discharge at the mouth is 115 m^{3}/s (4,100 cu ft/s). Its source is located in the Austrian state of Vorarlberg, where the river rises from lake Formarinsee in the Alps at an altitude of 1,870 metres (6,120 ft). It flows in a north-north-easterly direction and crosses the German border, forming the Lechfall, a 12-metre-high (39 ft) waterfall; afterwards the river enters a narrow gorge (the Lechschlucht). Leaving the Alps, it enters the plains of the Allgäu at Füssen at an elevation of 790 metres (2,580 ft) in the German state of Bavaria, where it used to be the location of the boundary with Swabia. The river runs through the city of Füssen and through the Forggensee, a man-made lake which is drained in winter. Here, it forms rapids and a waterfall.

The river flows further northwards through a region called the Lechrain, and passes the cities of Schongau, Landsberg, Augsburg (where it receives the Wertach) and Rain before entering the Danube just below Donauwörth at an elevation of 410 metres (1,330 ft). It is not navigable, owing to its torrential character and the gravel beds which choke its channel. There are extensive views of the Lech valley from Neuschwanstein Castle, near Füssen.

== Etymology ==
Inscriptions from 8/7 B. C. prove that the river name is first mentioned in the Celtic tribe name Licates. The river itself is called Likios or Likias in the 2nd century. Around the year 570 the name Licca is found in records. In the 8th century, names such as Lecha and Lech appeared. The term Licus is still used in 1059.

The name stands in analogy to the Welsh word llech ("stone slab") and the Breton word lec'h ("gravestone"). In this context, the meaning of the word "Lech" is explained as "the stony".

== History ==
On more than one occasion, historic events have been decided on the banks of this river.

- In 278 Roman emperor Probus vanquished a larger invasion force of Burgundians and Vandals, which had been raiding the Roman province of Rhaetia.
- At Lechfeld, a stony plain between the Lech and the Wertach near Augsburg, Otto I defeated the Magyars in August 955.
- In the Battle of Rain in April 1632, Gustavus Adolphus of Sweden defeated and mortally wounded Johan Tzerclaes, Count of Tilly.

== Hydroelectric power plants ==
Currently, there are 33 hydroelectric power plants on the Lech. The power plants are listed beginning at the headwaters:

| Dam | Name | Installed capacity (MW) | Year of completion | Image |
|---|---|---|---|---|
| 1 | Lechstaustufe Horn | 5.0 | 1952 | |
| 2 | Forggensee | 45.5 | 1954 | |
| 3 | Premer Lechsee | 19.2 | 1972 | |
| 4 | Lechstaustufe Lechbruck | 5.0 | 1903/1958 | |
| 5 | Lechstaustufe 3 – Urspring | 10.2 | 1971 | |
| 6 | Lechstaustufe 4 – Dessau | 10.2 | 1971 | |
| 7 | Dornautalsperre | 16.6 | 1960 | |
| 8 | Lechstaustufe 7 – Finsterau | 7.7 | 1950 | |
| 9 | Lechstaustufe 8 – Sperber | 7.3 | 1947 | |
| 10 | Lechstaustufe 8a – Kinsau | 9.2 | 1992 | |
| 11 | Lechstaustufe 9 – Apfeldorf | 7.2 | 1944 | |
| 12 | Lechstaustufe 10 – Epfach | 8.3 | 1948 | |
| 13 | Lechstaustufe 11 – Lechblick | 8.1 | 1943 | |
| 14 | Lechstaustufe 12 – Lechmühlen | 7.9 | 1943 | |
| 15 | Lechstaustufe 13 – Dornstetten | 8.2 | 1943 | |
| 16 | Lechstaustufe 14 – Pitzling | 7.9 | 1944 | |
| 17 | Lechstaustufe 15 – Landsberg | 8.0 | 1944 | |
| 18 | Lechstaustufe 18 – Kaufering | 16.7 | 1975 | |
| 19 | Lechstaustufe 19 – Schwabstadl | 12.0 | 1981 | |
| 20 | Lechstaustufe 20 – Scheuring | 12.2 | 1980 | |
| 21 | Lechstaustufe 21 – Prittriching | 12.1 | 1983 | |
| 22 | Lechstaustufe 22 – Unterbergen | 12.4 | 1982 | |
| 23 | Lechstaustufe 23 – Mandichosee | 12.0 | 1978 | |
| 24 | Hochablass | 3.1 | 2013 | |
| 25 | Eisenbahnerwehr | 3.2 | 2006 | |
| 26 | Wolfzahnauwehr | 2.0 | 2010 | |
| 27 | Kraftwerk Gersthofen | 9.9 | 1901 | |
| 28 | Kraftwerk Langweid | 7.0 | 1908 | |
| 29 | Kraftwerk Meitingen | 11.6 | 1922 | |
| 30 | Staustufe Ellgau | 10.0 | 1952 | |
| 31 | Staustufe Oberpeiching | 12.3 | 1954 | |
| 32 | Staustufe Rain | 11.2 | 1955 | |
| 33 | Staustufe Feldheim | 8.5 | 1960 | |

== Gallery ==
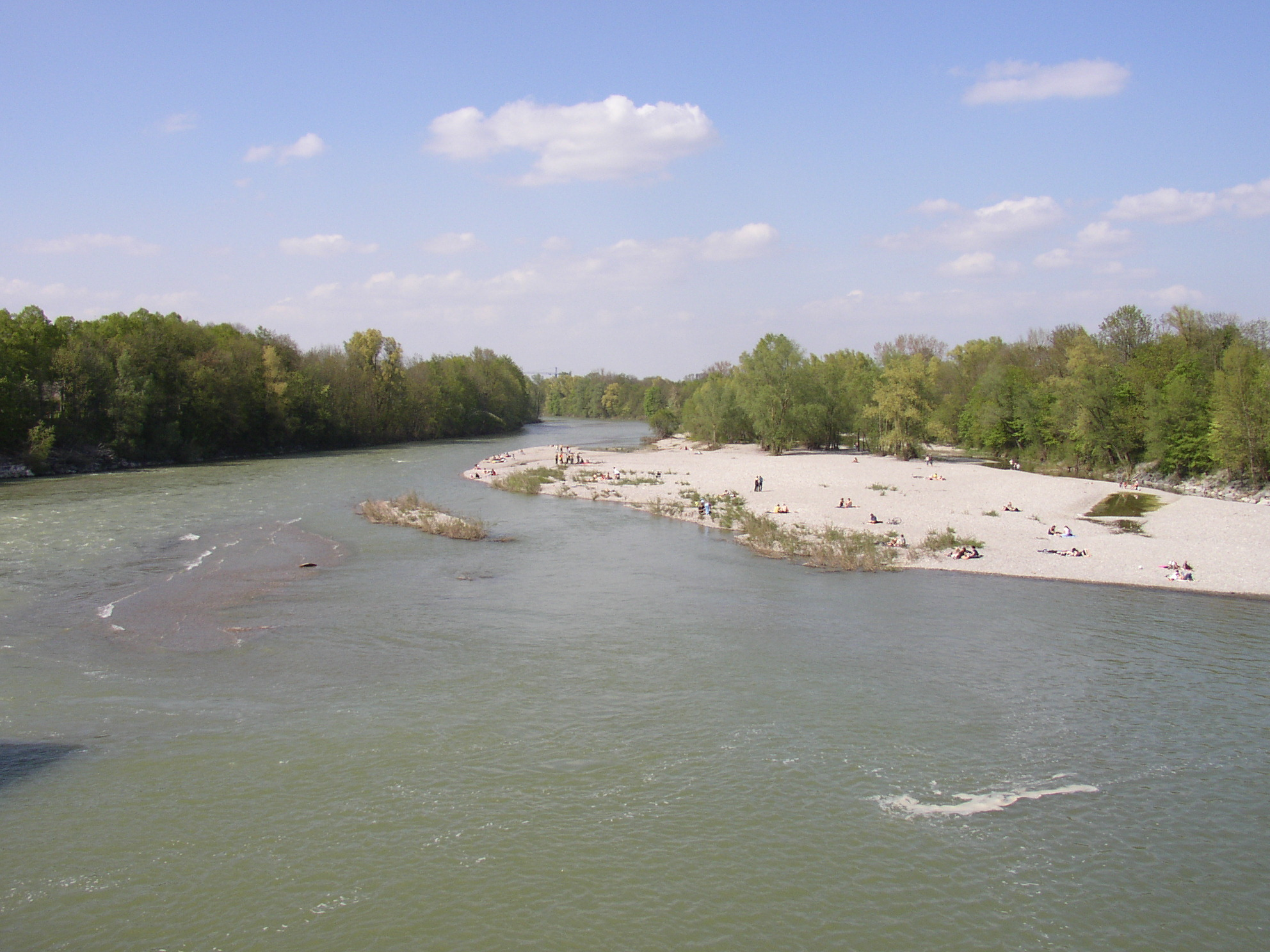
The Lech in Augsburg

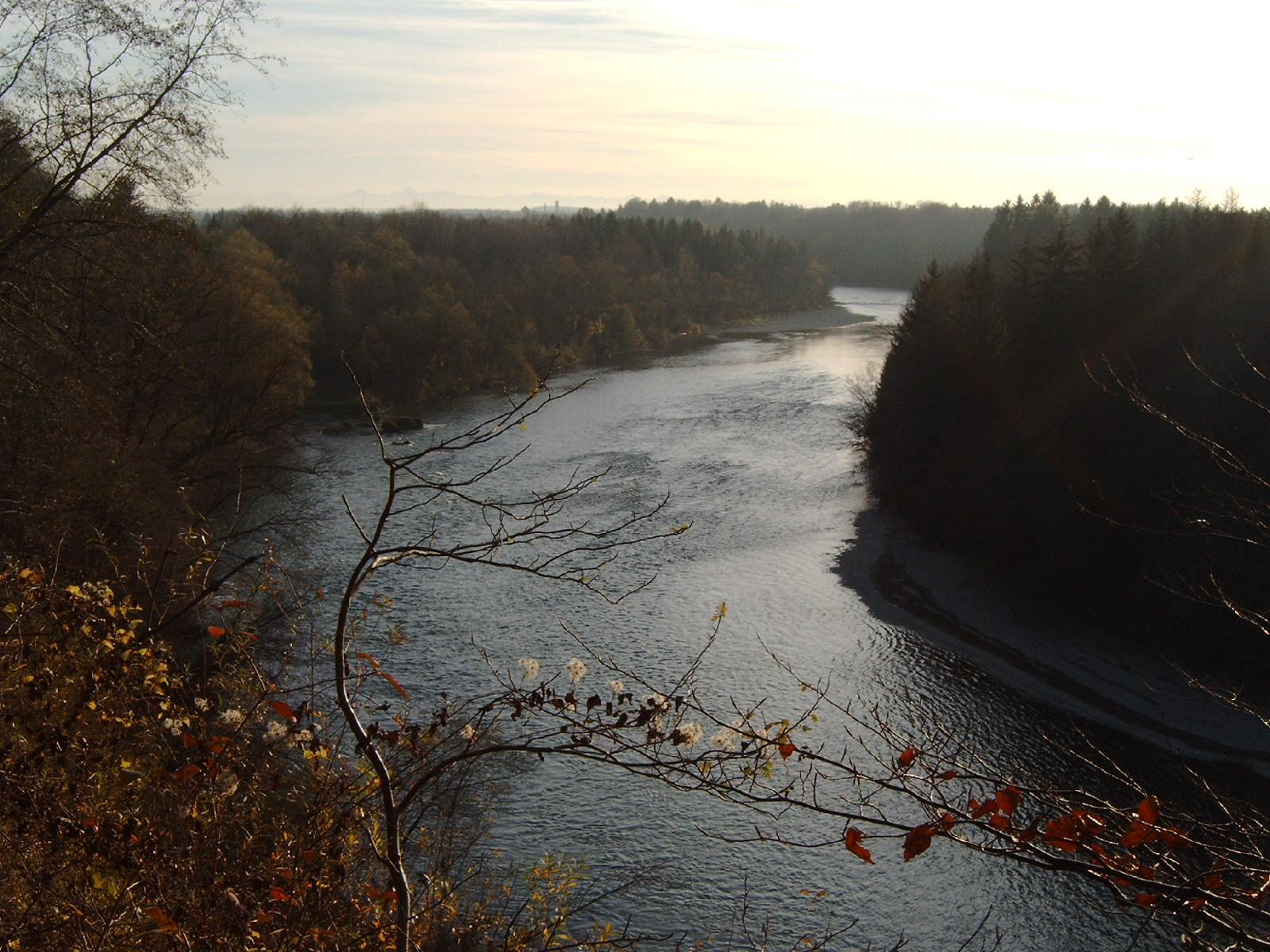
The Lech, in the background the city of Landsberg

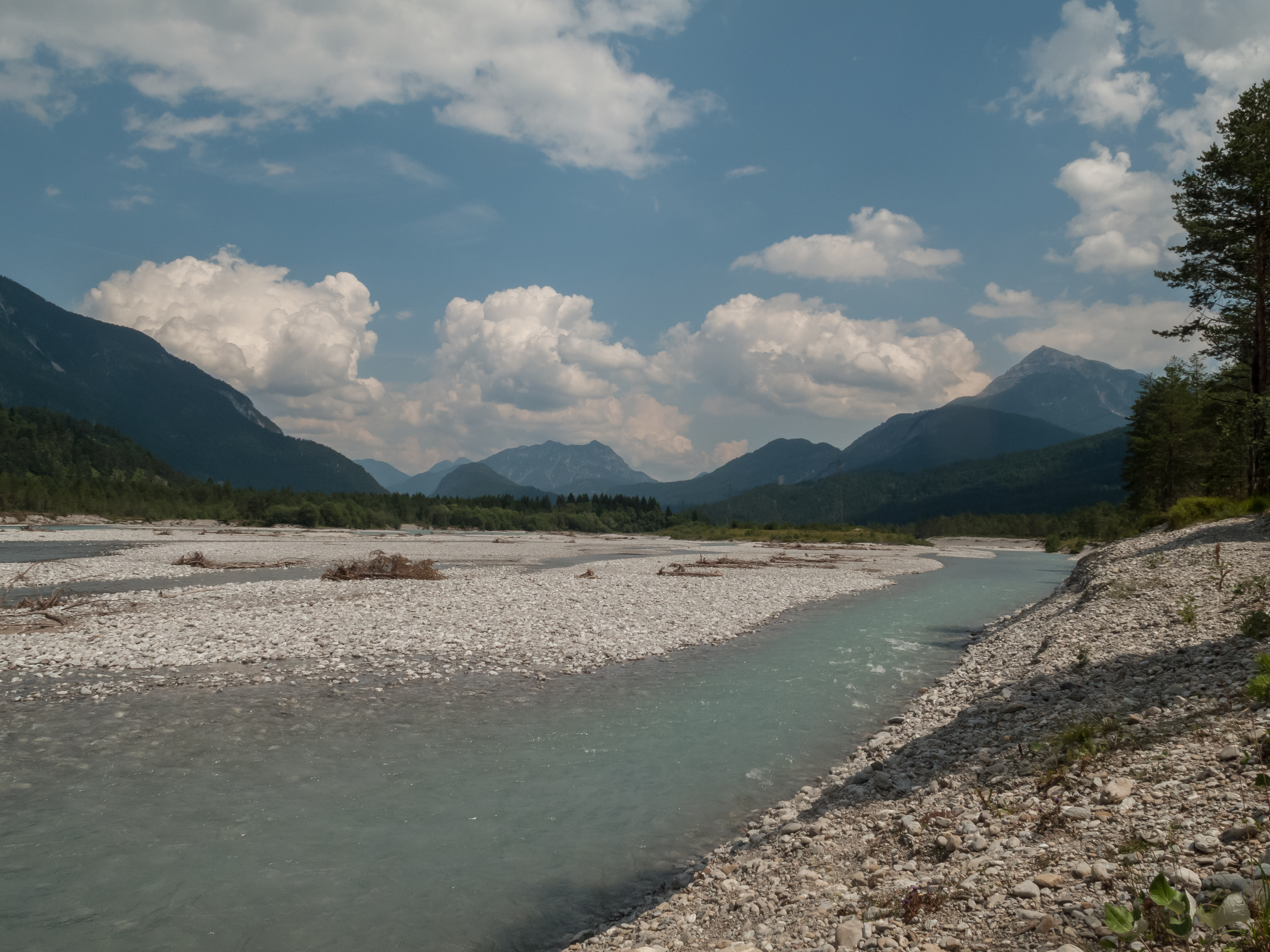
The Lech between Weissenbach and Forchach

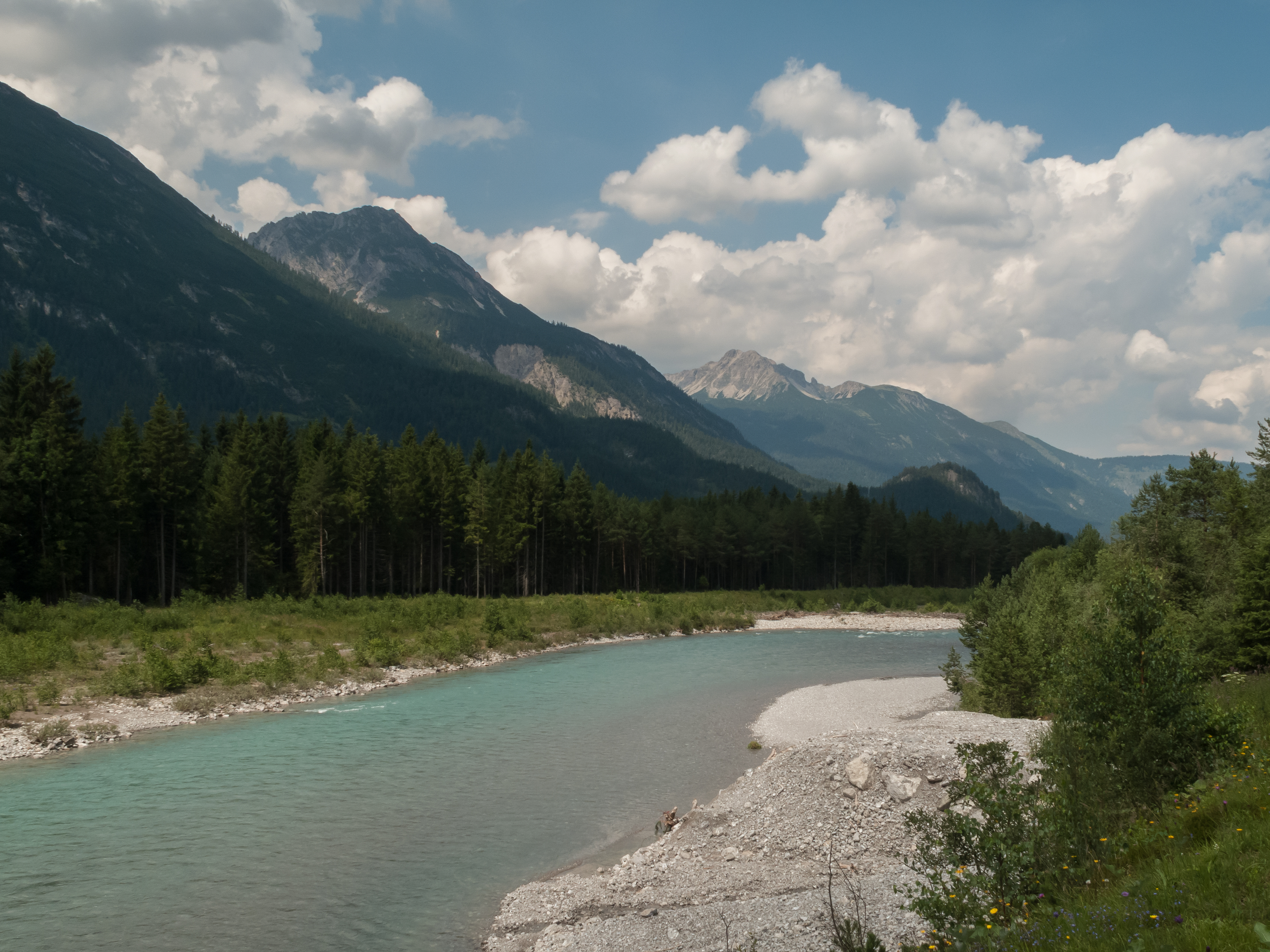
The Lech between Elmen and Stanzach

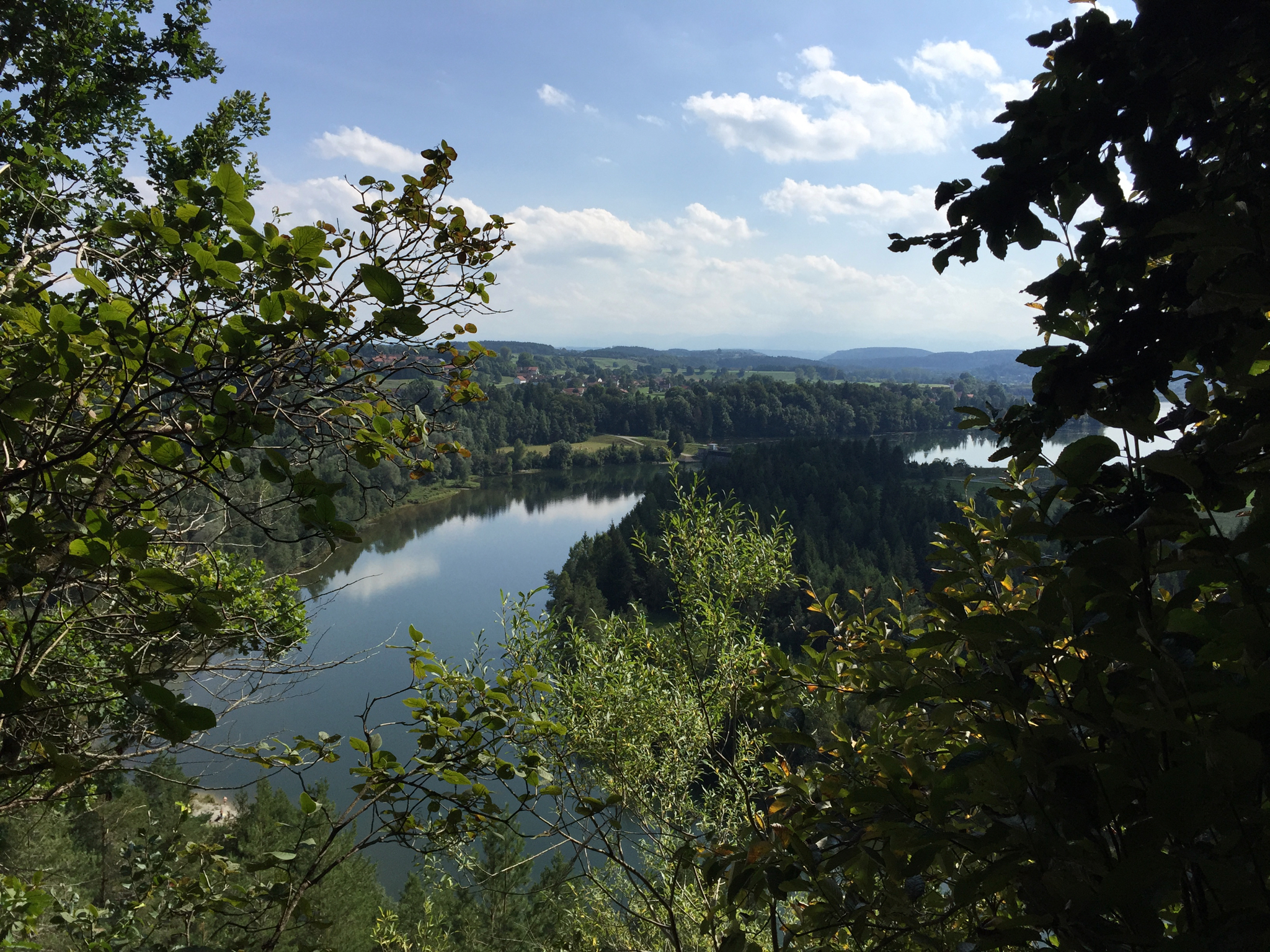
The Lech between Apfeldorf and Epfach

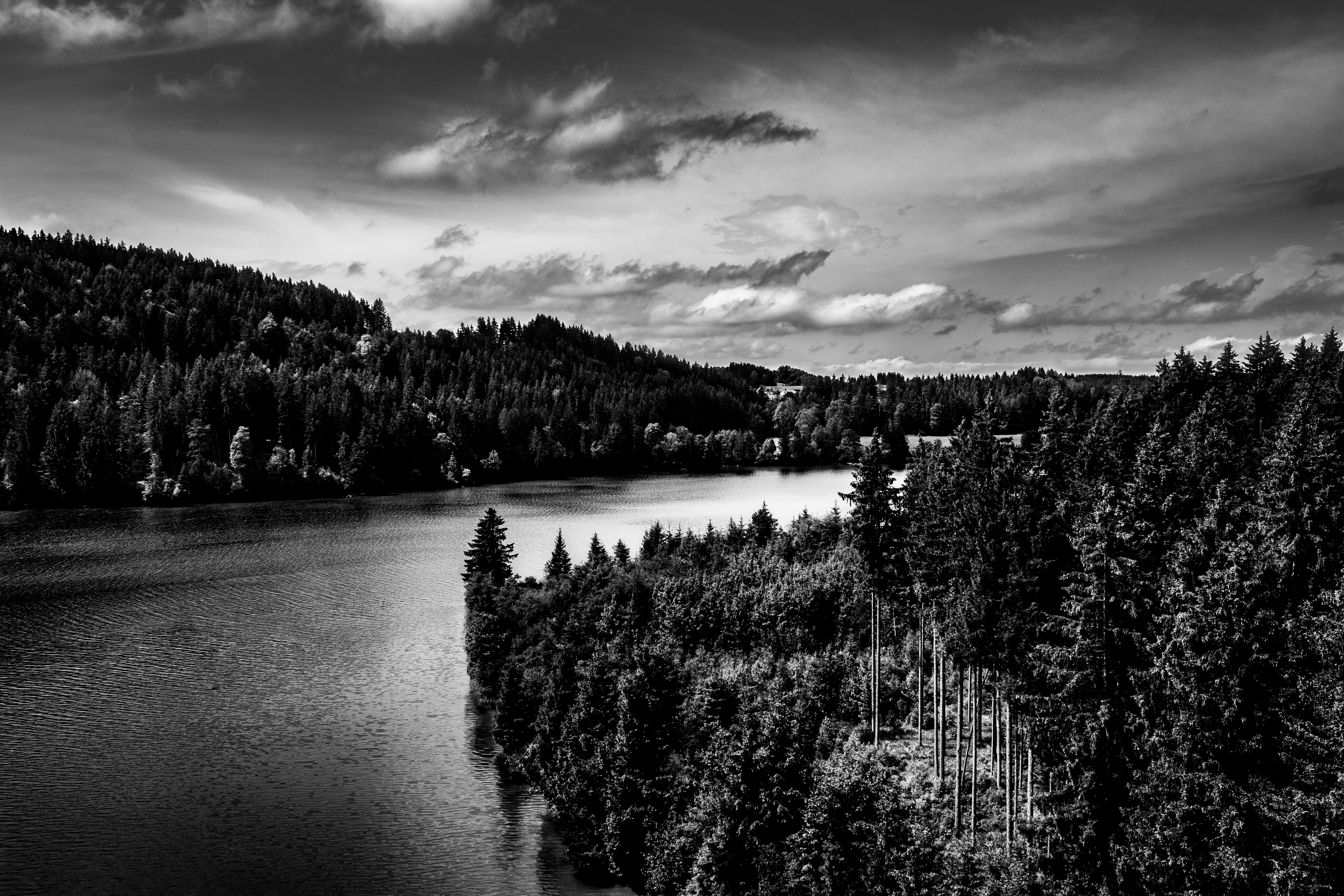
The Lech River by Andrei Gavrilița

== See also ==
- List of rivers of Bavaria
- List of rivers of Austria
