= Tegelberg Cable Car =

Coordinates: 47°34′04″N 10°45′24″E

A cabin on the Tegelbergbahn just after leaving the lower station.

The Tegelberg Cable Car (German: Tegelbergbahn), on the Tegelberg mountain near Schwangau in southern Bavaria. The cable car is 2,146.18 metres long, climbs a height of 892.5 metres, has a carrying cable of 48 mm in diameter and a hauling cable of 26 mm in diameter. It has two cabins each capable of transporting up to 44 persons. They are driven by a 2,540 KW engine. The cableway has a 38 metre high support pillar, made of reinforced concrete.

== Construction ==
The cableway was built by the South Tyrolean firm of Hölzl Seilbahnbau.

== Incident ==
There was an incident on 12 August 2011. After a tandem paraglider flew into the cables, operations had to be temporarily stopped. 132 people were flown from the top station back down to the valley. 30 passengers in the lower gondola had to be lowered by rope from a height of about 50 metres, an operation lasting into the evening. 19 passengers and the cable car operator in the upper gondola could not be rescued by helicopter until the morning of 13 August 2011, due to strong winds.

View of the lower station on approach

== Literature ==
- H. Popp: Römische Siedlungsreste bei Schwangau. Jahrbuch Alt-Füssen 12, 1936/37
- Günther Krahe: Eine römische Siedlung am Alpenrand bei Schwangau. Neue Ausgrabungen in Bayern. In: Probleme der Zeit. Zeitschrift für Wissenschaft und Kultur, München 1970. S. 23-27.
- Günther Krahe, Gisela Zahlhaas: Das Römerbad in Schwangau. Michael Laßleben Verlag, Kallmünz 1981
- Günther Krahe, Gisela Zahlhaas: Römische Wandmalereien in Schwangau, Bayrisches Landesamt für Denkmalpflege, Materialhefte zur Bayrischen Vorgeschichte Band 43. Fundinventare und Ausgrabungsbefunde. Michael Laßleben Verlag, Kallmünz 1984, ISBN 3-7847-5043-5
- Walter Sölter (ed.): Das römische Germanien aus der Luft. 2. Auflage. Gustav Lübbe Verlag, Bergisch-Gladbach 1983. ISBN 3-7857-0298-1. S. 34ff.
- Günther Krahe: Die Restaurierung der römischen Villa von Holheim im Ries und des römischen Badegebäudes bei Schwangau im Allgäu. In: Konservierte Geschichte? Antike Bauten und ihre Erhaltung. Konrad Theiss Verlag, Stuttgart 1985. ISBN 3-8062-0450-0. S. 164 ff.
- Wolfgang Czysz, Lothar Bakker: Die Römer in Bayern. Konrad Theiß Verlag, Stuttgart 1995, ISBN 3-8062-1058-6. S. 514.
