= Hopfensee =

Lake in Ostallgäu, Bavaria, Germany

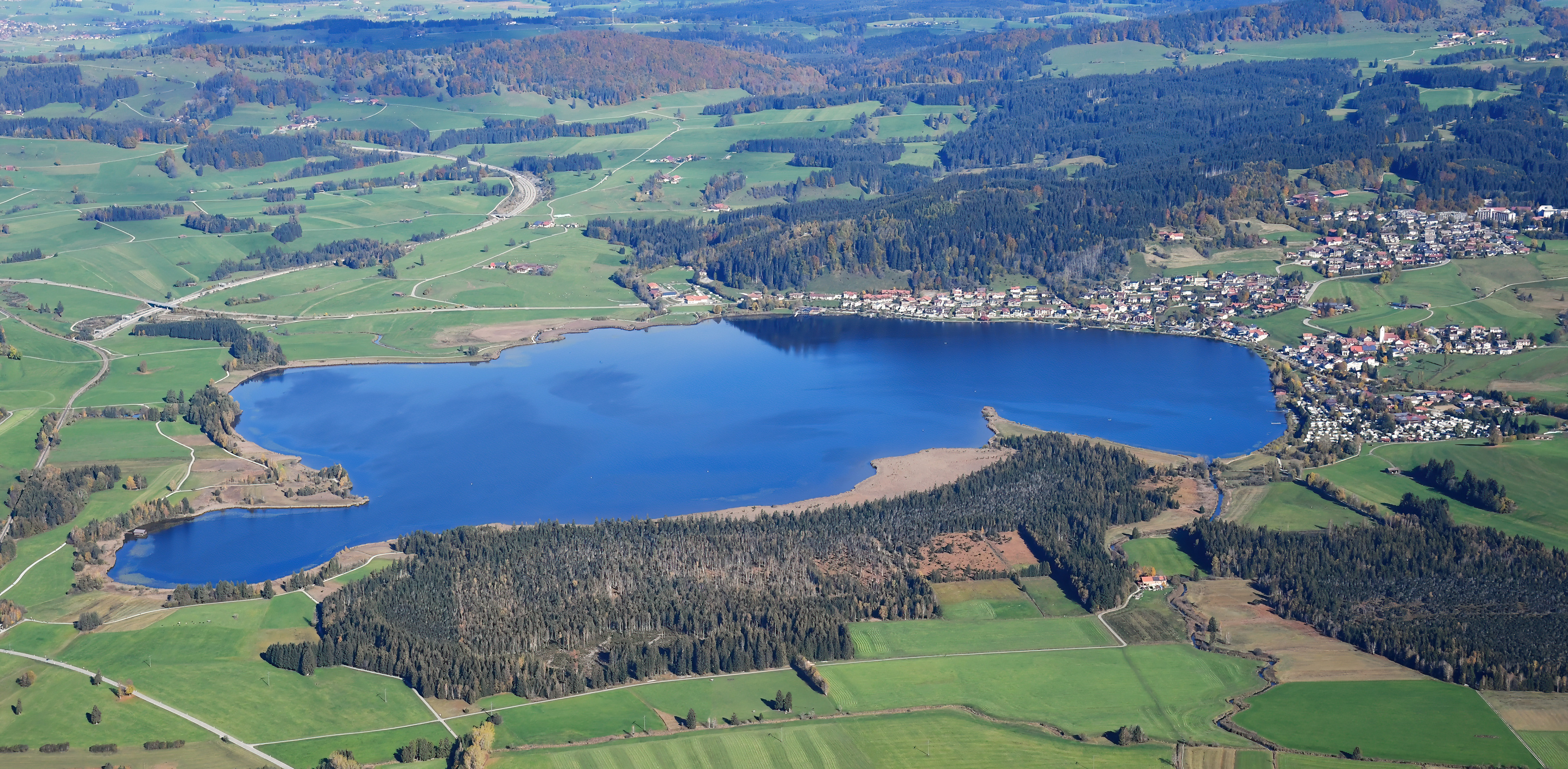

- Location within Bavaria
- Location: Swabia, Bavaria
- Coordinates: 47°36′3″N 10°40′16″E
- Primary inflows: Enzensberger-Bach, Rohrweiher-Bach, Hintere Hopfensee Ach, Kalten-Bach
- Primary outflows: Hopfensee Ach
- Basin countries: Germany
- Max. length: 2,145 m (7,037 ft)
- Max. width: 1.48 km (0.92 mi)
- Surface area: 194 ha (480 acres)
- Average depth: 4.6 m (15 ft)
- Max. depth: 10.4 m (34 ft)
- Water volume: 8,980,000 m^{3} (317,000,000 cu ft)
- Shore length^{1}: 6.8 km (4.2 mi)
- Surface elevation: 783.8 m (2,572 ft)
- ^{1} Shore length is not a well-defined measure.

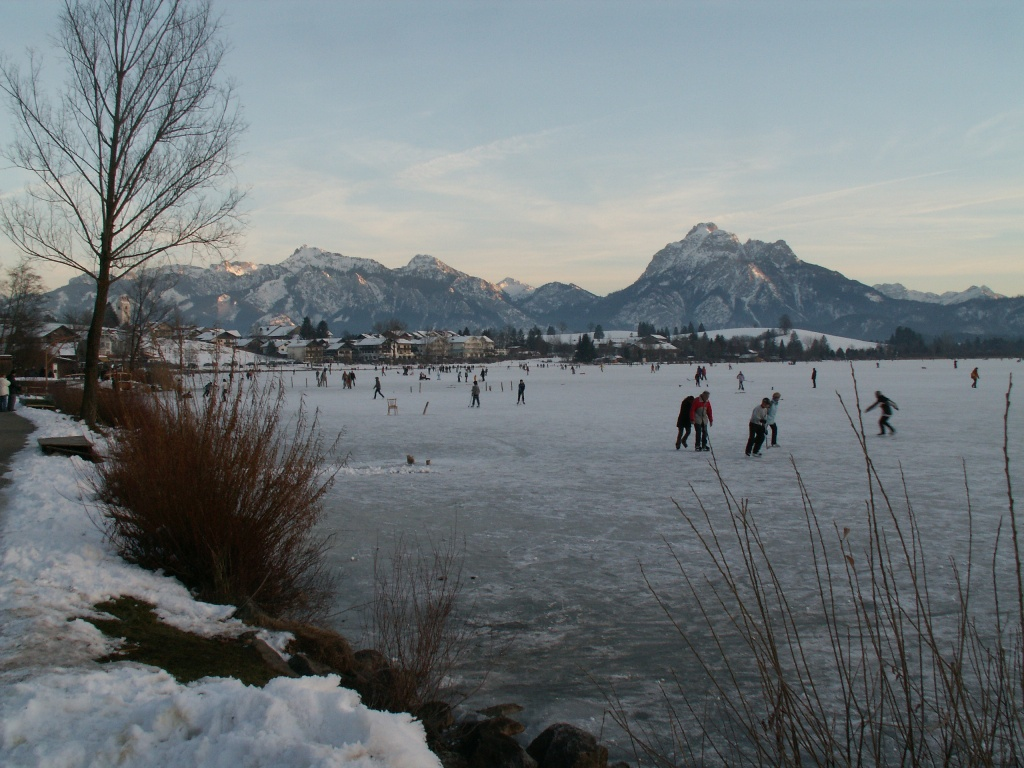
Frozen lake (December 2007)

Hopfensee is a lake in Swabia, Bavaria, Germany. At an elevation of 783.8 m, its surface area is 194 ha.

The maximum length of the lake is 2.1 km, and its circumference is 6.8 km. It lies north of Füssen in Ostallgäu. Its maximum depth is 10 m. It was formed by the Lechtal glacier and is one of the remains of a larger Fuessener See. The Hopfensee-Ach flows out of the lake and into the Forggensee.

On the northeast shore is the resort Hopfen am See. There is a campground on the east shore. Besides swimming, which is possible as early as the end of May, boating, sailing, and wind surfing are common activities.

The north shore has extensive views of the Allgäu Alps.

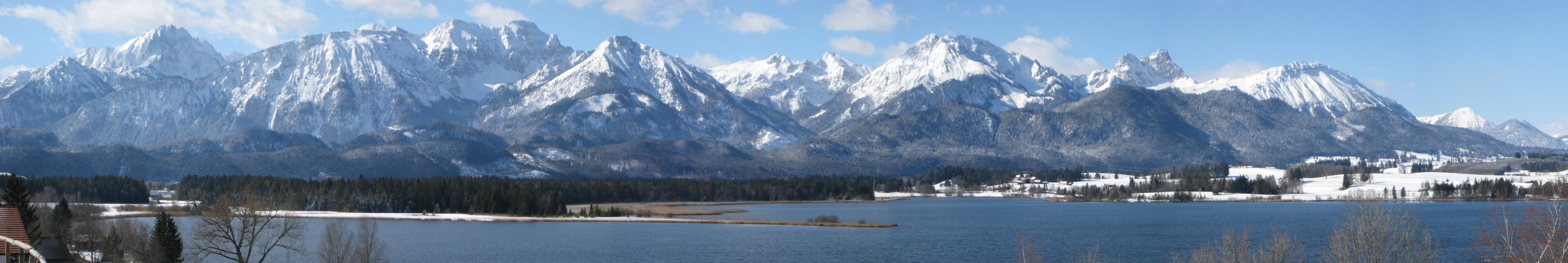
With Allgäu Alps in the background
