= Tegelberg =

Mountain in Bavaria, Germany

Coordinates: 47°33′34″N 10°46′43″E

Tegelberg fg
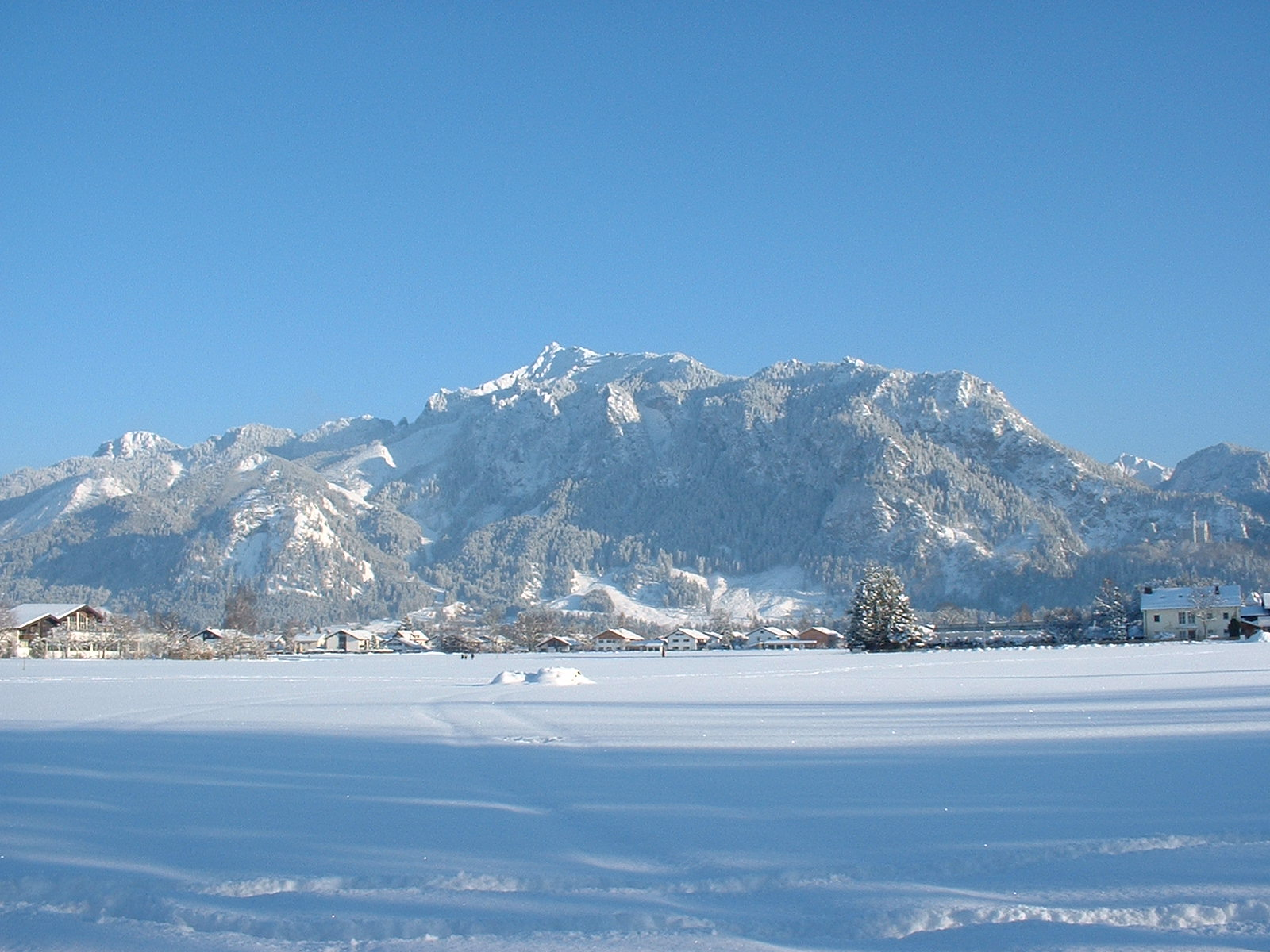

Highest point
- Elevation: 1,881 m (6,171 ft)

Geography
- Location: Bavaria, Germany

Tegelberg (German pronunciation: [ˈteːɡl̩bɛʁk]) is a mountain of Bavaria, Germany.

It is a part of the Ammergau Alps. The nearest town is Füssen. Neuschwanstein Castle and Hohenschwangau Castle are about 2 km away.

The Tegelberg has been a hang gliding area since the 1970s and a paragliding area since this adventure sport became popular in Germany. The FAI Hanggliding World Championship 1983 took place there.

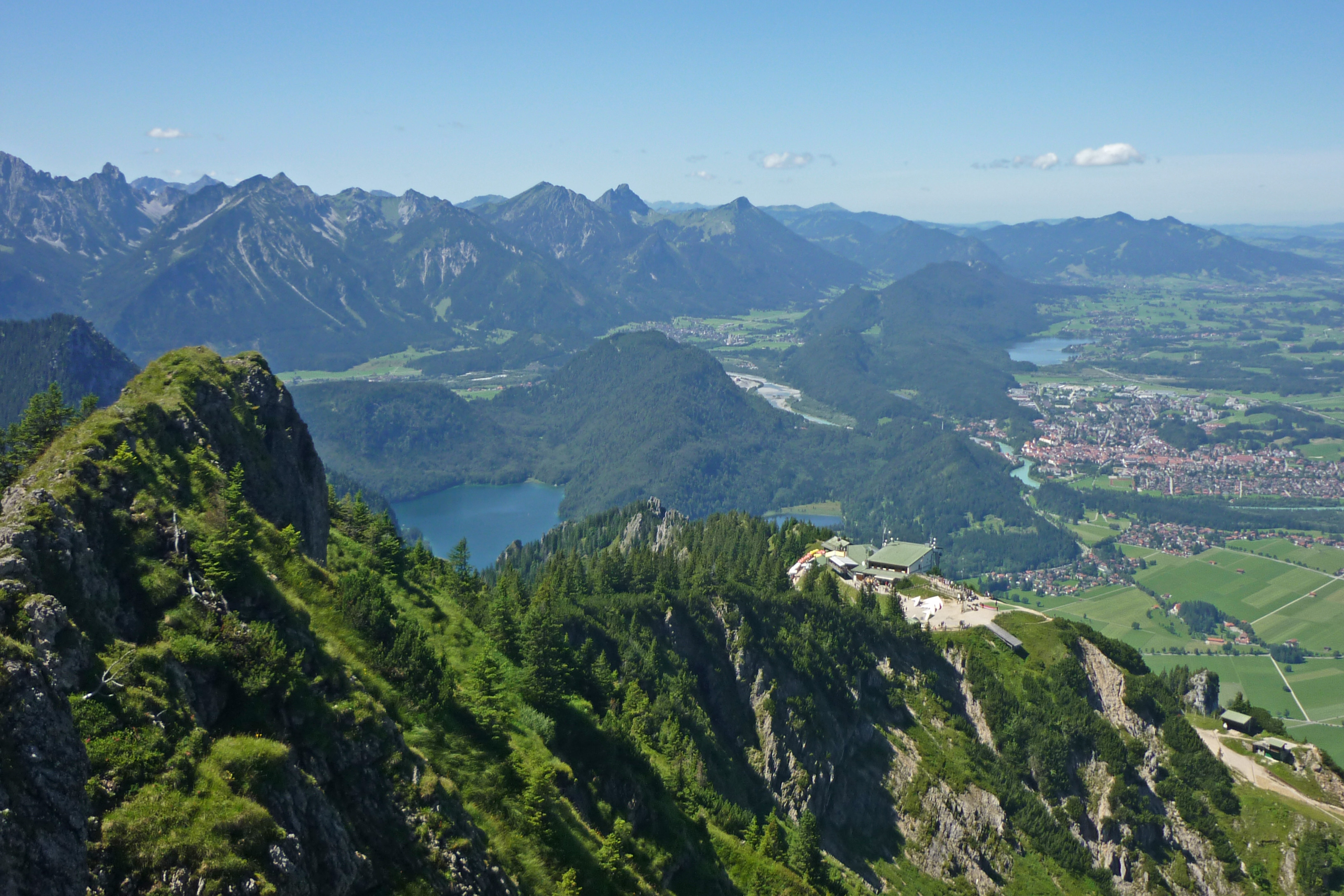
View to lake Alpsee and Füssen. Tegelberg Cable Car upper station.
