= Alpsee =

Lake in Ostallgäu, Bavaria, Germany

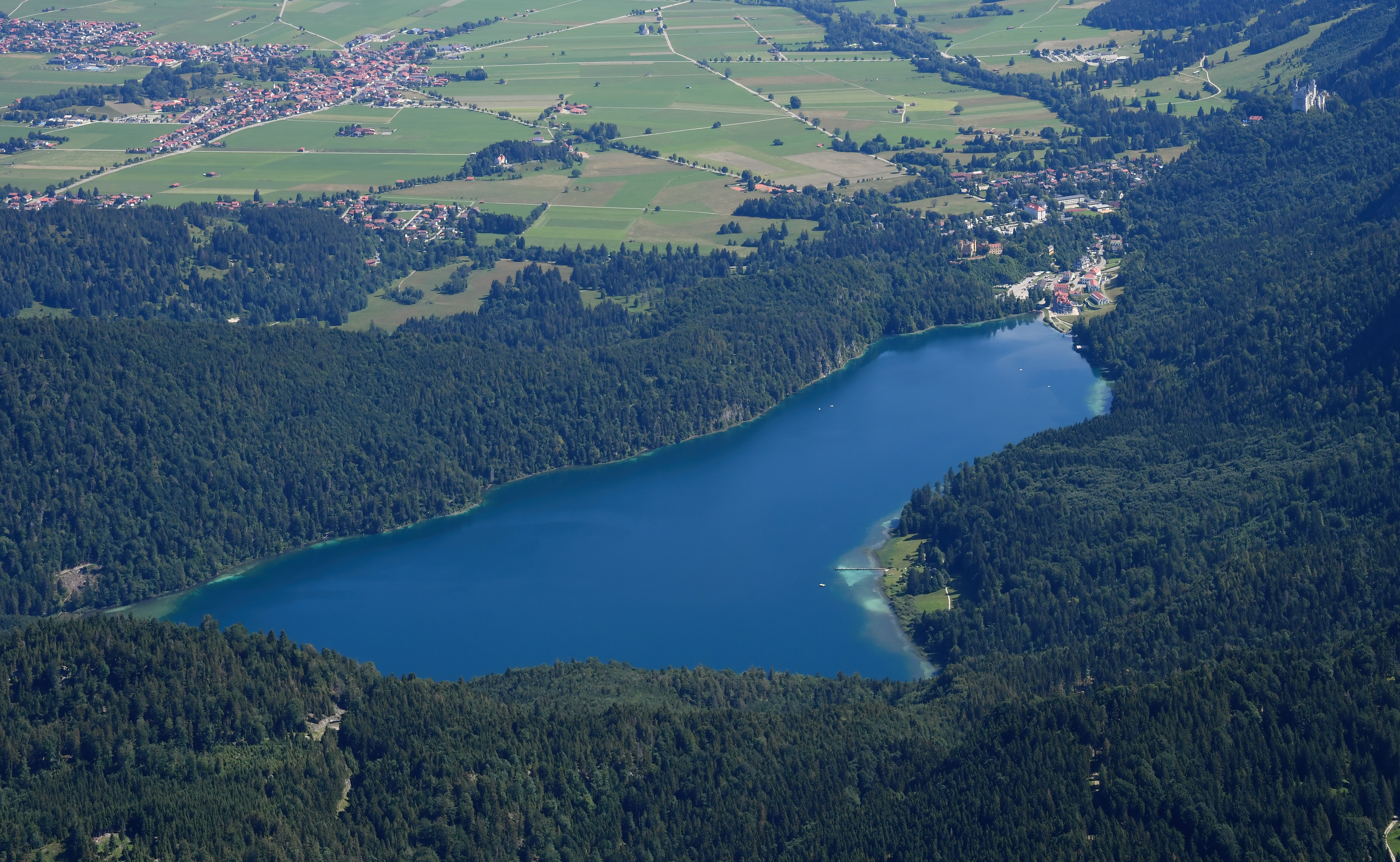
- Aerial view of the Alpsee

- Location within Bavaria
- Location: Ostallgäu, Bavaria
- Coordinates: 47°33′04″N 10°43′25″E
- Basin countries: Germany
- Max. length: 1.9 km (1.2 mi)
- Max. width: 100 m (330 ft)
- Surface area: 88 ha (220 acres)
- Max. depth: 62 m (203 ft)
- Shore length^{1}: 4.7 km (2.9 mi)
- Surface elevation: 813.94 m (2,670.4 ft)
- ^{1} Shore length is not a well-defined measure.

The Alpsee (German pronunciation: [ˈalpzeː]) is a lake in the Ostallgäu district of Bavaria, Germany, located about 4 kilometres southeast of Füssen. It is close to the Neuschwanstein and Hohenschwangau castles. The lake has just under five kilometres of shoreline and a depth of up to 62 metres.

== Description ==
Alpsee is a popular tourist attraction, given its proximity to the castles and the wild swans that inhabit the lake. Boats are available for rent and there is a wide variety of hiking trails in the vicinity. A circular path leads around the shore, and the "Fürstenstrasse" (Princes' Road) leads from Hohenschwangau over the Schwarzenberg ridge (Ammergau Alps) and down to Pinswang in the Lechtal.

== Gallery ==
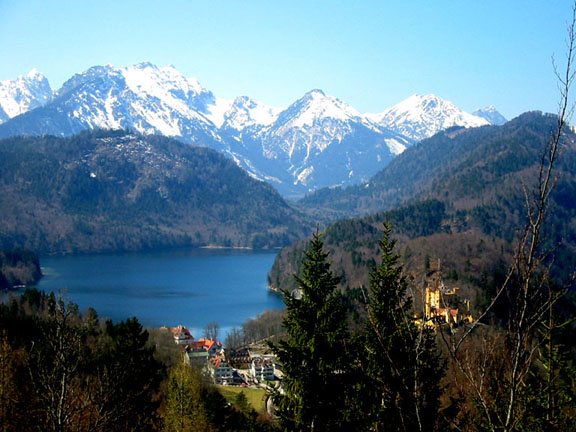
View from Neuschwanstein castle, with Schloss Hohenschwangau visible in the lower right

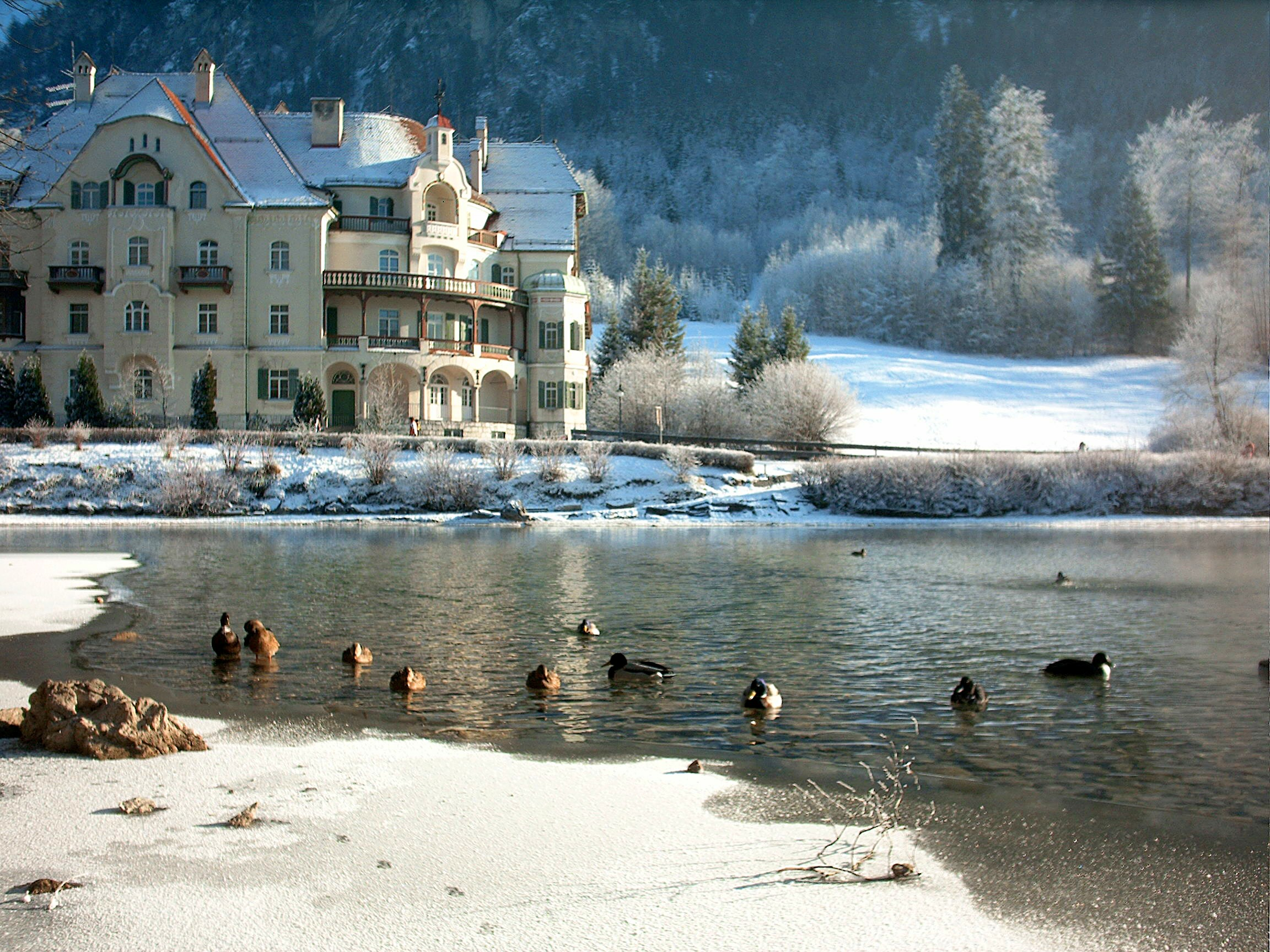
Hotel on Christmas Day 2006

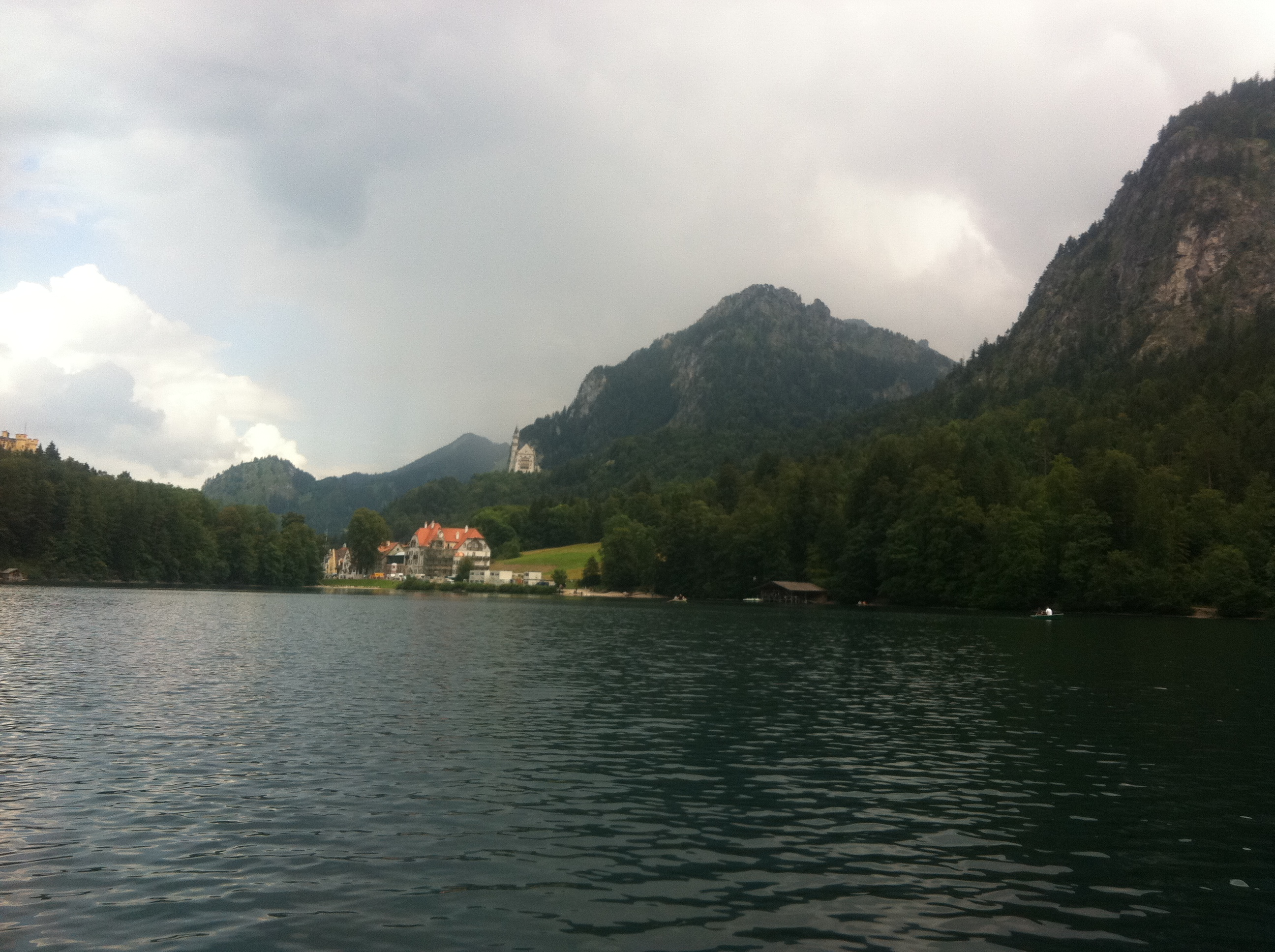
View on a boat 2011

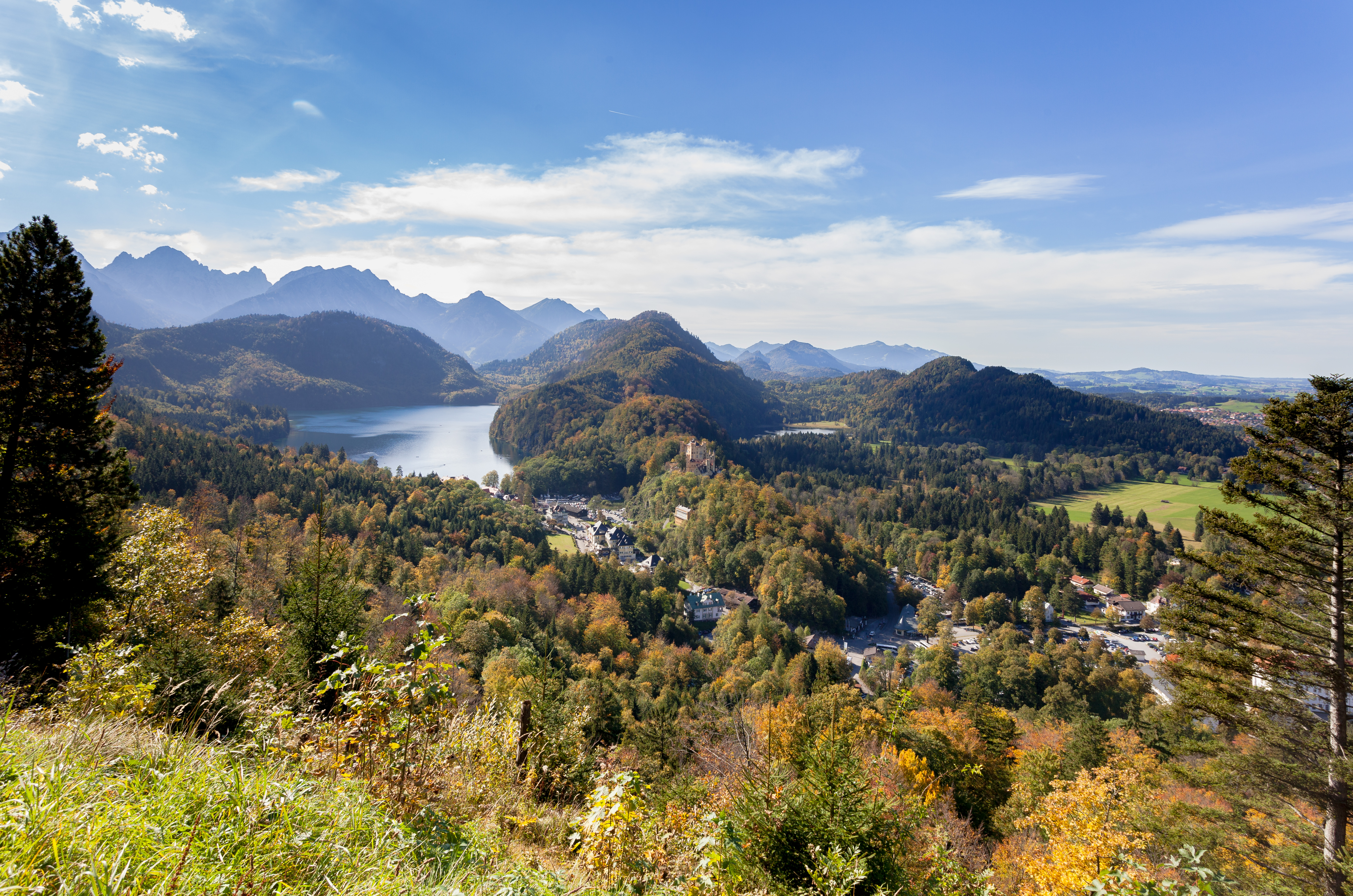
The Alpsee — with Neuschwanstein and Hohenschwangau castles
