= John Marzetti =

Italian-American businessman (1836–1899)

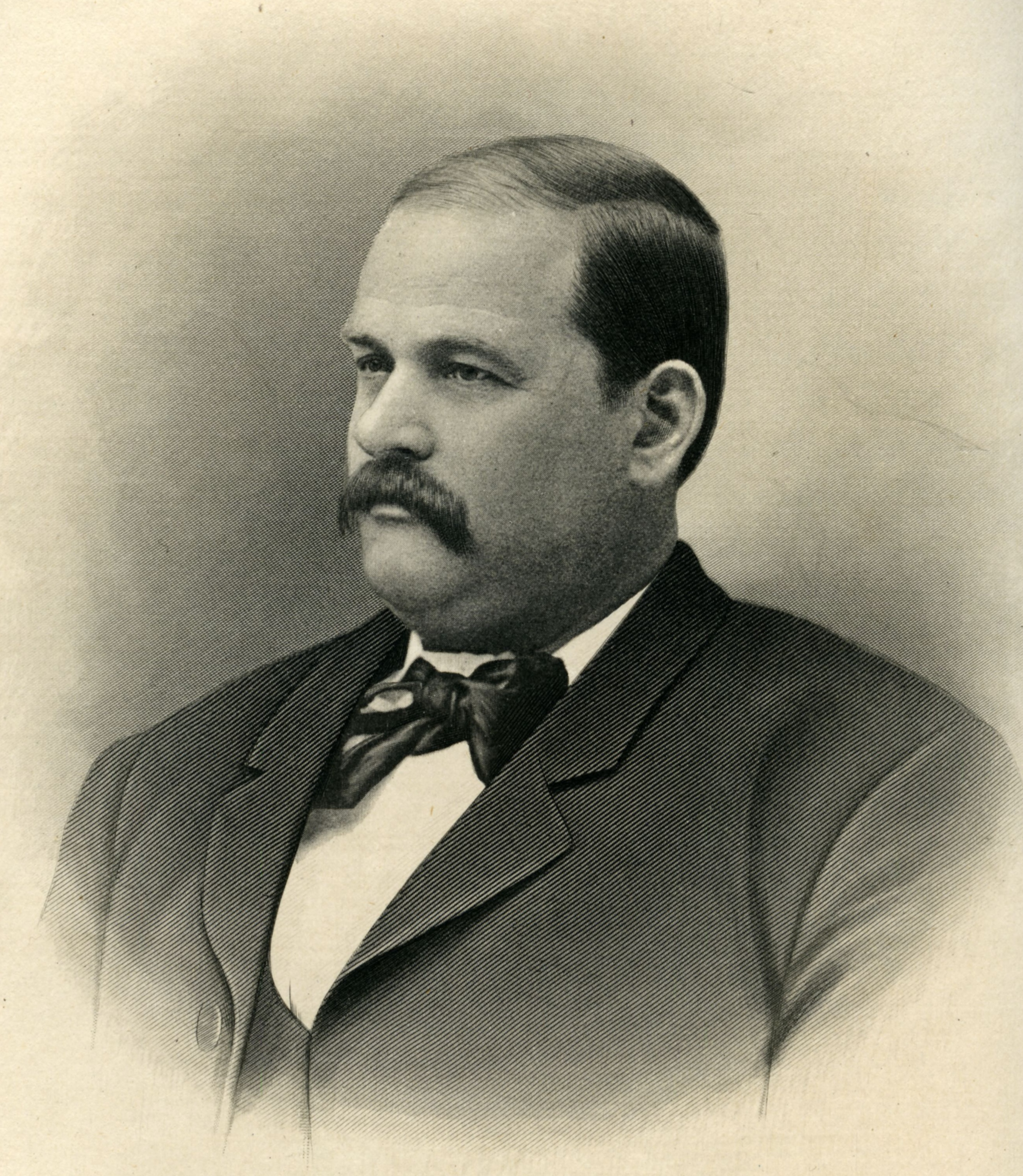
- Born: August 28, 1836; Bagni di Lucca, Tuscany
- Died: December 25, 1899 (aged 63); Columbus, Ohio, US
- Burial place: Mount Calvary Cemetery, Columbus, Ohio
- Occupations: Grocer; restaurateur; real estate developer; philanthropist
- Spouse: Marie Simons

Signature
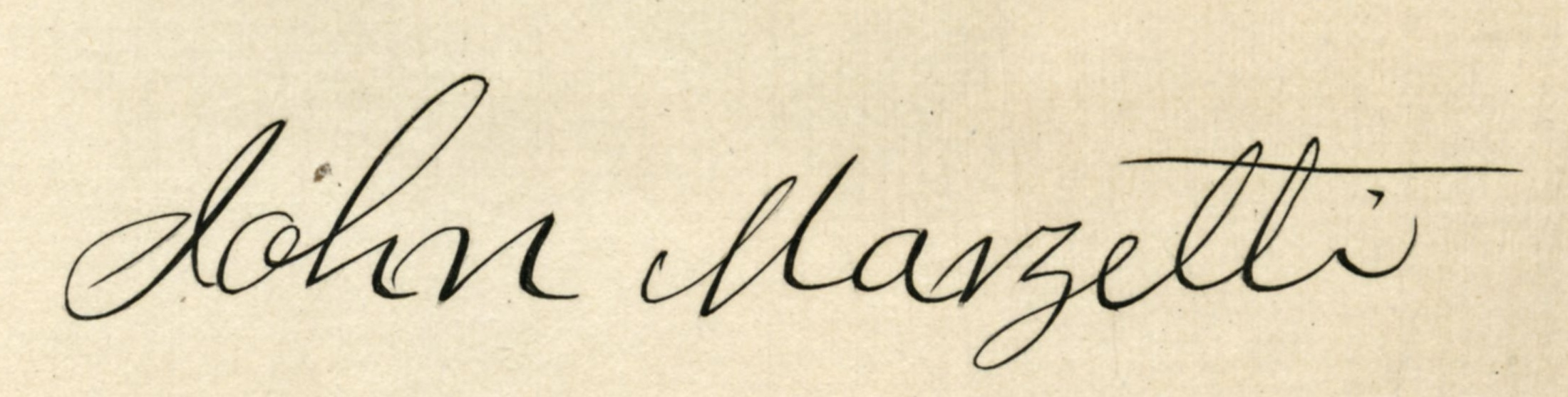

John Marzetti (July 28, 1836 – December 25, 1899) was an Italian-American grocer, restaurateur, real estate developer, and philanthropist who resided in Columbus, Ohio. Accounts differ as to whether Marzetti is related to Teresa Marzetti, another Italian immigrant who founded the T. Marzetti Company in Columbus in 1896, or if he is the namesake for the midwestern pasta casserole Johnny Marzetti.

== Biography ==
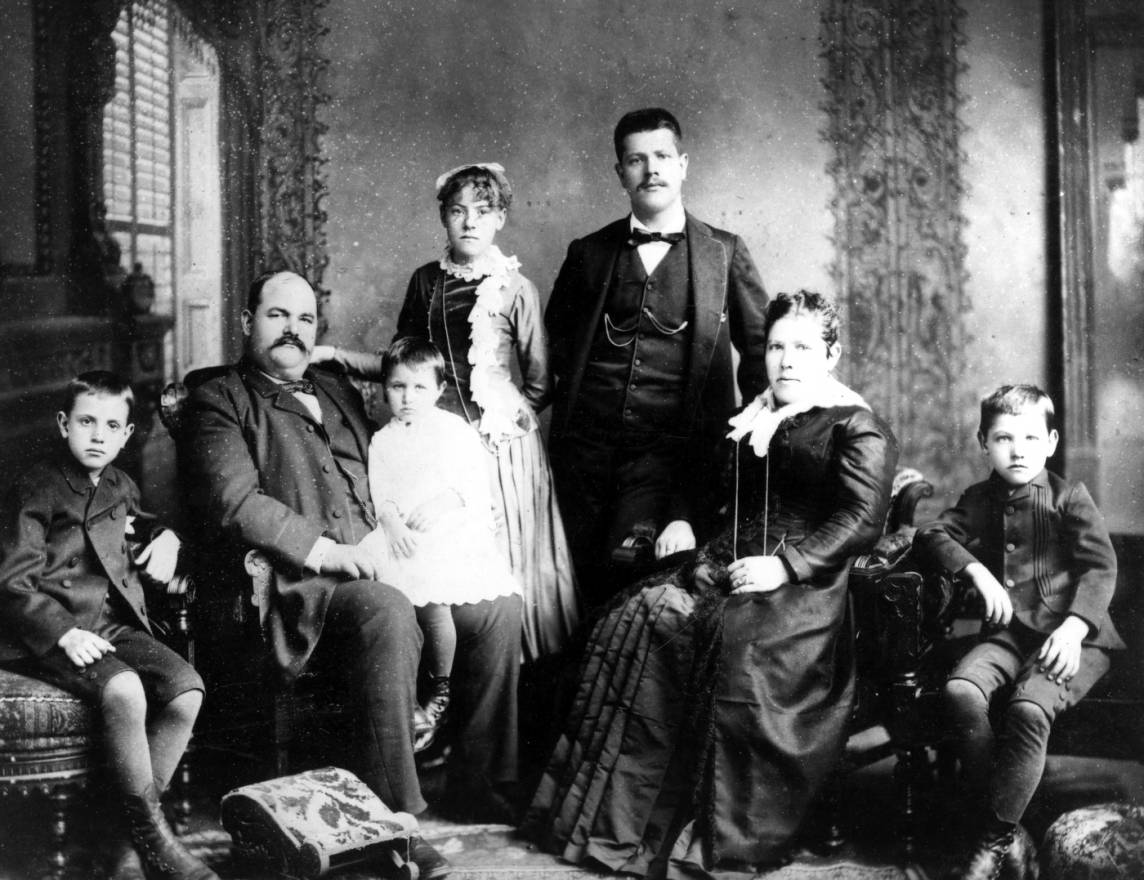
Marzetti with his wife and children in 1886

Marzetti was born in Bagni di Lucca, Tuscany, in 1836 and emigrated to the United States as a child. He went on to work in shipping on the Ohio River before arriving in the city of Columbus in the summer of 1861, barefoot with only five cents in his pocket. He sold a pocket watch for twelve dollars and purchased two barrels of apples with the proceeds, selling them at the corner of High and Gay streets in Downtown Columbus and reinvesting the proceeds to purchase more fruit. It was also in 1861 that Marzetti married his wife, Marie Simons. They had five children: John Jr., Edward, Joseph, Mary, and Ella. John Jr., who also went by Johnny, became a real estate developer like his father before dying in 1872.

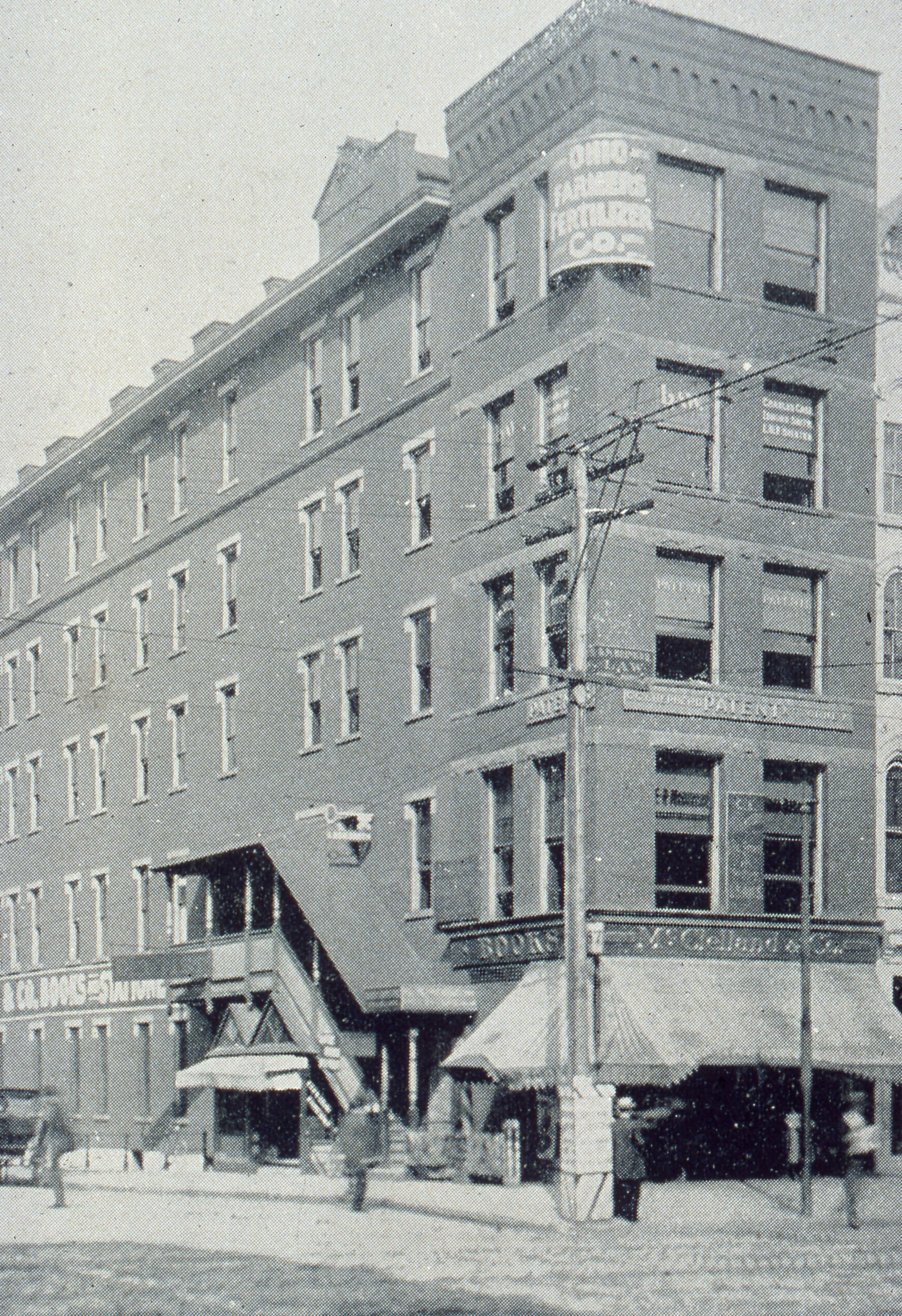
One of Marzetti's downtown Columbus properties in 1896

By 1873, Marzetti purchased a lot of land near where he had sold his first apples for $20,000 and his net worth was estimated between $50,000 and $70,000. Offerings at his grocery stores eventually included oysters, cigars, fruit, liquor, and even Best's Beer, along with restaurants serving prepared meals. Marzetti also expanded his investments into commercial ventures including a motor omnibus operating from Union Station to High Street and the construction of a three-story commercial building on High Street.

Marzetti also was a donor to charitable institutions throughout Columbus, including St. Patrick School, Columbus City Schools, and the Holy Name Society of St. Joseph Cathedral. A Catholic, he was also one of the primary funders for St. John the Baptist Church, the Catholic church serving Italian-Americans in Columbus, donating the land upon which the church was built in 1896, as well as $6,000 of his own money. He continued to support the church after its completion, auctioning off a parcel of his land to fund its operation, and hosting fundraisers for its benefit at his home. He was also a donor to Sacred Heart Church in Cincinnati, another Italian Catholic church in Ohio. Marzetti became bedridden with chronic gastritis in the early winter of 1899, and died of a cerebral hemorrhage on December 25, 1899, leaving an estate valued at $100,000 ($3.87 million in 2025). His funeral was at St. John the Baptist and he is buried at Mount Calvary Cemetery in Columbus.
