= Saints Peter and Paul Seminary =

Former high school seminary in the United States

- Type: Catholic seminary; Minor seminary; High School
- Active: 1956–1990
- Parent institution: Pontifical Institute for Foreign Missions
- Religious affiliation: Catholic
- Location: 2734 Seminary Rd SE; Heath, Ohio, U.S. 39°59′55″N 82°29′16″W
- Campus: 580 acres (230 ha); Rural

Saints Peter and Paul Seminary was a Catholic high school seminary in Heath, Ohio, serving the Pontifical Institute for Foreign Missions (PIME). It was founded in 1956 and closed in 1990. Its Heath campus was subsequently acquired by the Diocese of Columbus and operated as a retreat house and as a convent for Dominican Nuns of the Perpetual Rosary until their departure in 2023.

== History ==
=== Background ===
The Pontifical Institute for Foreign Missions, or PIME, was organized by Pope Pius XI in 1926 to work in foreign missions for the Catholic Church. Following World War II, the order expanded into the United States so as to raise money to rebuild their apostolates that had been damaged by the war and to represent PIME to the American Catholic Church. At the invitation of Bishop Michael Ready in 1948, PIME began staffing St. John the Baptist Church in the Italian Village neighborhood of Columbus, the community's first presence in Central Ohio.

=== Founding ===
Desiring to take advantage of the boom in vocations following the postwar years in the United States, PIME leadership began planning to build a seminary in the United States in the early 1950s. In 1952, a house was acquired at 324 East North Broadway in Columbus for 10 seminarians, the first home of Sts. Peter and Paul. In 1953, Augustine Wherle, a successful but aging Columbus businessman with a farm of more than 500 acres situated near Newark was looking for a charitable organization to donate his property to when Bishop Ready, a friend of his, told him about PIME's work. Wherle proposed to the PIME superiors that he donate the land and a sizable amount of money to them.

On August 15, 1955, Wherle deeded the land to PIME and construction on the building, designed by architect Victor Basso with influences from Chinese architecture, began in June 1956. Students and faculty moved into the completed building on December 27, 1956. By 1958, there were 27 high-school age men studying for PIME at Sts. Peter and Paul. In 1964, there were 72 students, ten of whom were theology students living on-site but commuting to the Pontifical College Josephinum.

A three-year expansion project began in 1963 with the construction of a gymnasium and dormitory complex. A three-story addition was built to the seminary in 1966, adding dormitory space for up to 120 students; the gymnasium was expanded, and the previous dormitories were converted to classrooms. By the 1970s, school officials preferred to keep enrollment at about 70; in the early 1980s, the student population had stabilized at about 50, and this number had dwindled to 30 by 1989.

In addition to the dormitory complex, the 542-acre (219 ha) parcel contained a pond and shelter house. The facility received community support from a variety of events, including an annual ox roast. Students enrolled at the seminary competed in inter-seminary basketball against other Ohio seminaries, including the Josephinum and St. Francis Seminary.

=== Closure and alternate uses ===
Due to a shortage of priests to run the institution, the closure of Sts. Peter and Paul was announced in 1990, with the last class graduating on June 2 of the same year; the school's enrollment had risen from 27 to 44 students, exacerbating the staffing issue. It was the last remaining high school seminary in the state of Ohio. It continued to be used by PIME for retreats, meetings, and as a hub for ministry and missionary awareness in local parishes until the property was closed by the order and sold to the Diocese of Columbus in 2003. It continued to be used for retreats and youth outreach until it was closed again in 2020 due to declining use. It briefly served as a convent for the Dominican Nuns of the Perpetual Rosary beginning in 2022 until the community left the diocese in 2023.
