= Anna Marie Hahn =

American serial killer (1906–1938)

Anna Hahn
- Mugshot of Anna Marie Hahn
- Born: Anna Marie Filser; July 7, 1906; Füssen, Bavaria, German Empire
- Died: December 7, 1938 (aged 32); Ohio State Penitentiary, Ohio, United States
- Other names: Marie Felser; Marie Fisher; Arsenic Anna; The Blonde Borgia; Angel of Mercy
- Status: Execution by electrocution
- Conviction: First degree murder
- Penalty: Death

Details
- Victims: 5
- Span of crimes: May 6, 1933 – August 1, 1937
- Country: United States
- States: Ohio, Colorado
- Date apprehended: 1937

Anna Marie Hahn (née Filser; July 7, 1906 – December 7, 1938) was a German-born American serial killer. She murdered 5 elderly men from Cincinnati by poison between 1933 and 1937. She was convicted of murder and executed by electric chair in 1938.

== Early life ==
Anna Hahn was the youngest of twelve children though five of her siblings had died by the time Anna was born. Her father, Georg Filser, was a furniture manufacturer, and the family was considered to be well-off financially.

At age 19, she became pregnant with her son Oskar, and told her family that the father was a Dr. Max Matscheki, a well-known cancer researcher from Vienna. However, no record of a Dr. Matscheki was found and the identity of Oskar's real father remains unknown. Hahn's scandalized family sent her to the United States in 1929, while her son remained with them in Bavaria. While staying with relatives Max and Anna Doeschel in Cincinnati, Ohio, Hahn met fellow German immigrant Philip Hahn; they married in 1930. Hahn briefly returned to Germany to retrieve Oskar, then she and her husband started a family.

== Murders ==
Hahn allegedly began poisoning and robbing elderly men in Cincinnati's German community to support her gambling habit. 73-year-old Ernest Koch (also Ernst Kohler), who died on May 6, 1933, was believed to be her first victim. Hahn had befriended him shortly before his death. He left her a house in his will.

Her next alleged victim, Albert Parker, 72, also died soon after she began caring for him. Prior to Parker's death, she signed an I.O.U. for $1,000 that she borrowed from him, but after his death, the document was either discarded or simply "disappeared". Jacob Wagner, 78, died on June 3, 1937, leaving $17,000 cash to his "beloved niece" Hahn. She soon began caring for 67-year-old George Gsellman, also of Cincinnati. For her service before his death on July 6, 1937, she received $17,000.

Hahn killed her last victim, 67-year-old Georg Obendoerfer, on August 1, 1937, after he traveled to Colorado Springs, Colorado, with her and her son. Police said that Obendoerfer, a cobbler, "died in agony just after Mrs. Hahn had bent over his deathbed inquiring his name, professing she did not know the man". Hahn's son testified at her trial that he, his mother, and Obendoerfer traveled to Colorado by train from Cincinnati together and that Obendoerfer began getting sick en route.

=== Investigation ===
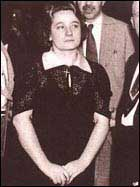
Hahn shortly after her arrest

An autopsy revealed high levels of arsenic in Obendoerfer's body, which aroused police suspicions. Exhumations of two of her previous clients revealed that they had been poisoned. Hahn was a prime suspect, and was soon arrested.

Hahn was convicted after a four-week trial in November 1937. Sentenced to death, she went to the electric chair at the Ohio Penitentiary in Columbus on December 7, 1938. She was buried in Mount Calvary Cemetery in Columbus.

== See also ==
- List of serial killers in the United States
