= Bernard Shields =

American soldier during Civil War

Private Bernard Shields
- Born: c. 1833; Ireland
- Died: 20 April 1887 (aged 53-54); Ohio
- Burial place: Mount Calvary Cemetery, Columbus, Ohio
- Military career
- Allegiance: United States (Union)
- Branch: Army
- Service years: 1861-1865
- Rank: Private
- Units: Company E, 2nd West Virginia Cavalry
- Conflicts: Appomattox, Virginia
- Awards: Medal of Honor

Bernard Shields (c. 1833 - 20 April 1887) was a private in the United States Army who was awarded the Medal of Honor for gallantry during the American Civil War. He was awarded the medal on 3 May 1865 for actions performed at the Battle of Appomattox Station in April 1865.

== Personal life ==
Shields was born in about 1833 in Ireland. He married Anna Friel and fathered four children. He died in Ohio on 20 April 1887 and was buried in Mount Calvary Cemetery in Columbus, Ohio.

== Military service ==
Shields enlisted in the Army on 19 September 1861 as a private and was assigned to Company K of the 2nd West Virginia Cavalry. On 23 November 1864 he was reassigned to Company E of the same unit. On 8 April 1865, at the Battle of Appomattox Station, he captured the flag of the Washington Artillery, a Confederate unit.

Shields' Medal of Honor citation reads:

The President of the United States of America, in the name of Congress, takes pleasure in presenting the Medal of Honor to Private Bernard Shields, United States Army, for extraordinary heroism on 8 April 1865, while serving with Company E, 2d West Virginia Cavalry, in action at Appomattox, Virginia, for capture of flag of the Washington Artillery (Confederate States of America).

— E. M. Stanton, Secretary of War

Shields was mustered out of the Army on 30 June 1865.
