= Mount Calvary Cemetery (Columbus, Ohio) =

Catholic cemetery in Columbus, Ohio

Coordinates: 39°56′50.6″N 83°1′28.12″W

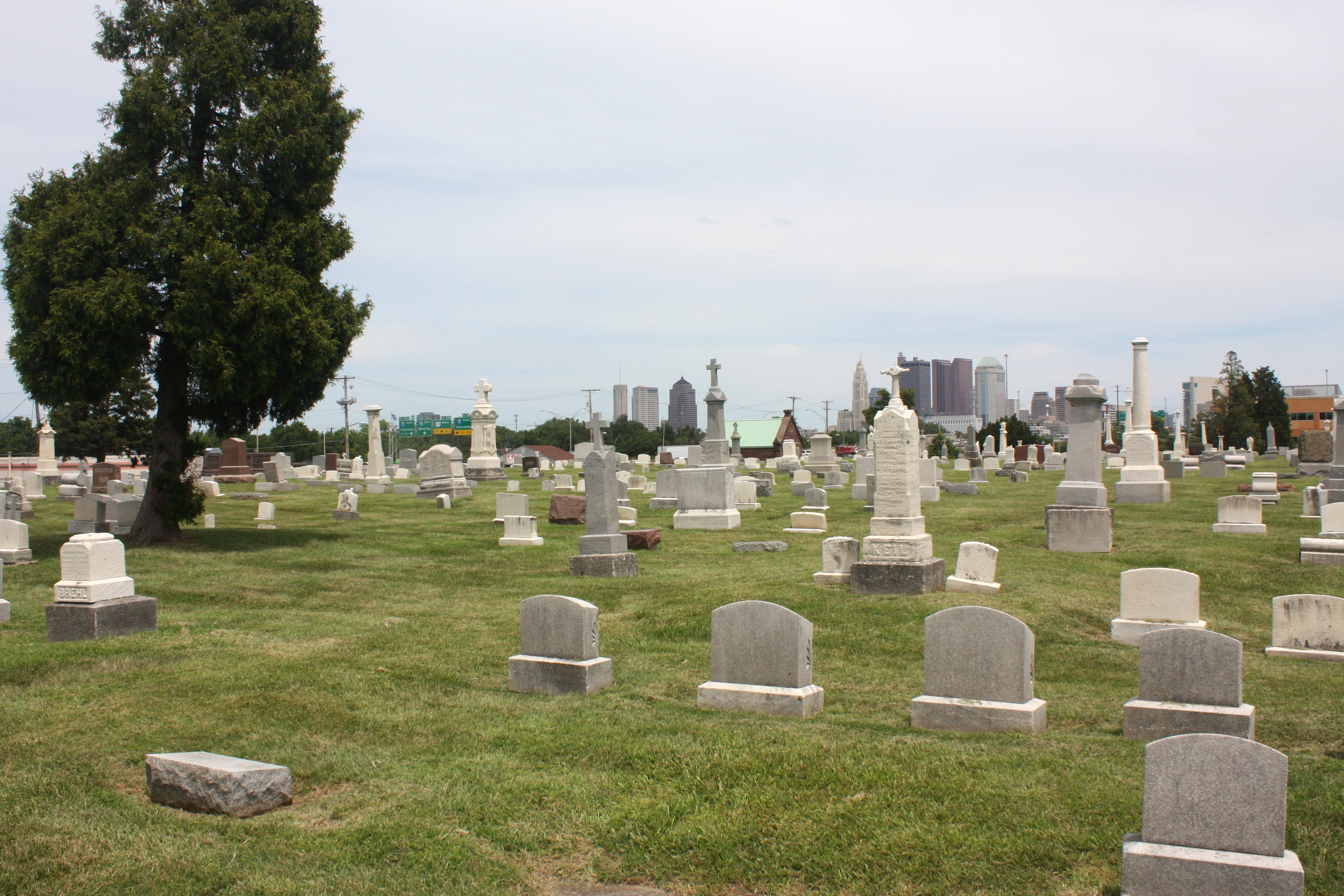
- Interactive map of Mount Calvary Cemetery

Details
- Established: 1874
- Location: 518 Mount Calvary Avenue; Columbus, Ohio, 43223
- Type: Roman Catholic
- Owned by: Roman Catholic Diocese of Columbus
- Size: 40 acres (16 ha)
- No. of graves: 40,000
- Website: https://www.catholiccemeteriesofcolumbus.org/cemeteries/mount-calvary-cemetery
- Find a Grave: Mount Calvary Cemetery

Mount Calvary Cemetery is a Roman Catholic cemetery in Columbus, Ohio, located west of downtown next to Green Lawn Cemetery and by the now-abandoned Cooper Stadium. It is the oldest active Catholic cemetery in Franklin County. It is maintained by the Roman Catholic Diocese of Columbus, and has approximately 40,000 interments over 40 acres (16 ha).

Mount Calvary is divided into two sections that were historically paid for and separately maintained by two parishes of different ethnic backgrounds. The north section, "Holy Cross," was for the German parish, and the "Cathedral" section was for the Irish parish. Separating those two sections is the "Priests' Circle," reserved for clergy.

== History ==
The cemetery was established in part to replace the old St. Patrick's Cemetery, which was located in downtown Columbus and had become encircled by the city's growth. A plot of just over 25 acres (10 ha) of land, outside the city's original limits, was purchased in 1865 by John F. Zimmer in trust for the Diocese of Columbus, and burials on the site also began that year. Zimmer purchased an adjoining two-acre (0.81 ha) plot in 1866 and sold the two plots to the Diocese in 1868. The land was further expanded in 1871 by three plots purchased by Father John Ambrose Watterson, later Bishop of Columbus.

The cemetery was consecrated in 1874 by Bishop Sylvester Rosecrans. Bishop Rosecrans further directed that no more burials were to be made in the old St. Patrick's Cemetery. The Diocese finally requested in 1887 that burials be moved from there to Mount Calvary, but met resistance from family of the deceased. The controversy was ultimately decided by the Supreme Court of Ohio, which ruled in the Diocese's favor that the old cemetery was no longer practical to maintain. Burials from St. Jacob Cemetery (also known as Frey Cemetery or German Catholic Cemetery) were also moved to Mount Calvary between 1906 and 1908.

On March 25, 1913, a catastrophic flood devastated the nearby neighborhood of Franklinton and covered the western portion of the cemetery, destroying some property and records.

== Notable burials ==
- Anna Marie Hahn (1906 - 1938), a serial killer who was the first woman executed in the electric chair in Ohio.
- Graham McNamee (1888 - 1942), pioneering radio broadcaster.
- John Ambrose Watterson (1844 - 1899), Bishop of Columbus from 1880 until his death; namesake of Bishop Watterson High School.
- Louis Zettler (1832 - 1907), Columbus businessman, City Councilman, and Chief of Police.
- Oliver C. Haugh (1871 - 1907), a Dayton, Ohio, doctor who was executed on April 19, 1907, the 26th person to be executed in Ohio by electric chair. He was convicted as a serial killer, having burnt his parents’ home near Dayton, killing his father, mother and brother. He is also believed to have killed women in Liman, Lorain, Chicago, and Cincinnati (Mary McDonald, Luella Mueller, Amy Steingeway, Mary Twohey, Anna Patterson, Mary Rickert). He was buried in an unmarked grave in the single grave or the unconsecrated section. His records and the site of his final resting place were lost in the flood of 1913.
- John Marzetti, Columbus resident, Italian-American businessman who helped found St. John the Baptist Church in Italian Village.
- Bernard Shields, Union army soldier who won the Medal of Honor for actions at the Battle of Appomattox Station.
- Graham McNamee, American radio broadcaster who invented Play-by-play commentary.
