= Tobias Woerle =

Former German ice hockey player

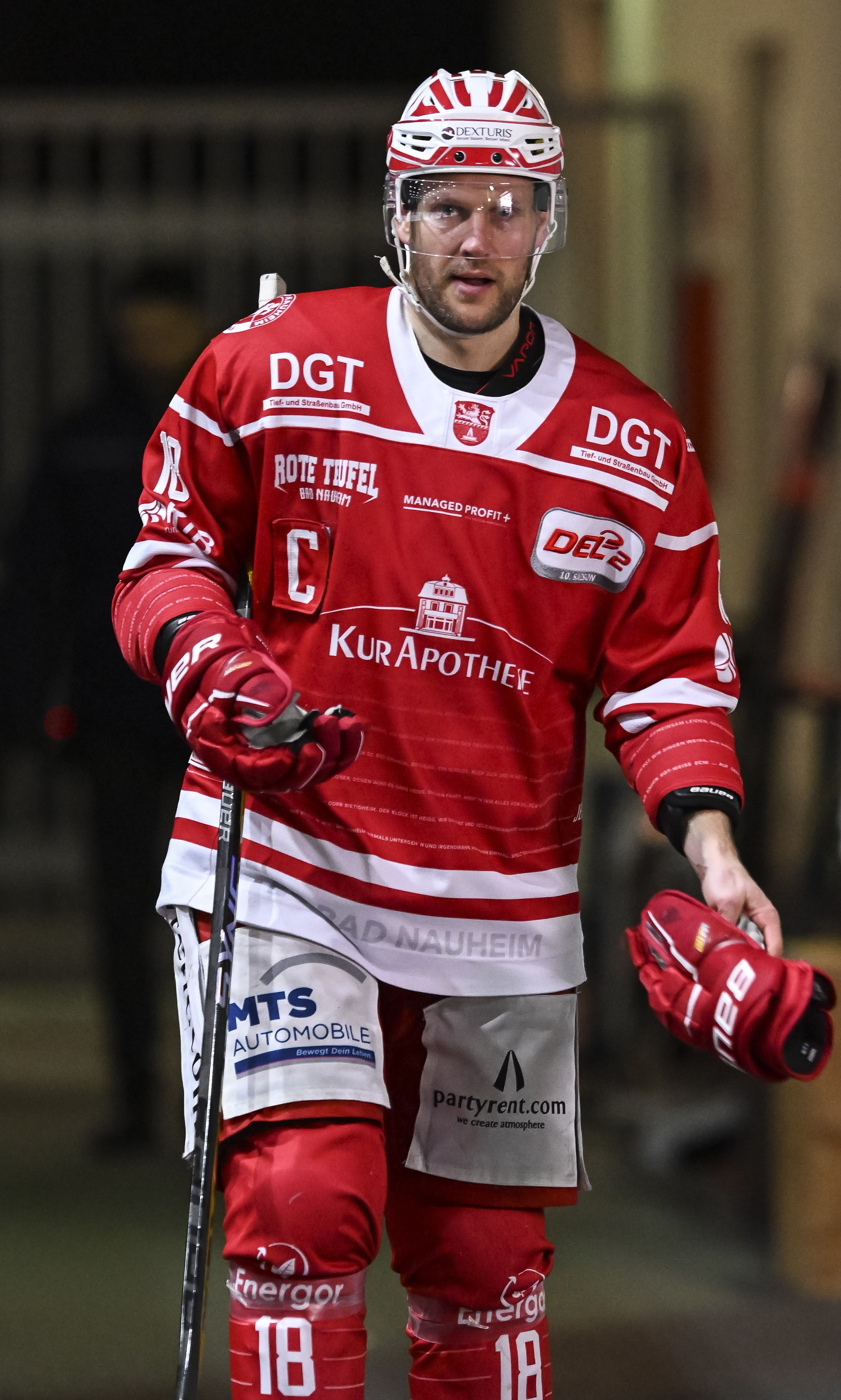
- Born: August 1, 1984 (age 41) Füssen, West Germany
- Height: 5 ft 10 in (178 cm)
- Weight: 172 lb (78 kg; 12 st 4 lb)
- Position: Left wing
- Shot: Left
- DEL2 team Former teams: EC Bad Nauheim; Kassel Huskies; Frankfurt Lions; Iserlohn Roosters; Straubing Tigers; EHC München; Schwenninger Wild Wings; ESV Kaufbeuren
- Playing career: 2005–2023

Tobias Woerle (born August 1, 1984) is a former German professional ice hockey player. Until his retirement in February 2023, he has been playing for EC Bad Nauheim in the DEL2. He has previously played in the Deutsche Eishockey Liga (DEL) for the Iserlohn Roosters, Straubing Tigers, EHC München and Schwenninger Wild Wings and for ESV Kaufbeuren in DEL2.

Upon capturing the championship in both of his seasons with EHC München, Woerle left the club following the 2016–17 season as a free agent in signing a two-year contract with the Schwenninger Wild Wings on May 4, 2017.

At the completion 2018–19 season, his second year with the Wild Wings, Woerle left Schwenninger at the conclusion of his contract. After 14 seasons in the top flight DEL, Woerle signed a one-year contract with ESV Kaufbeuren of the DEL2 on April 18, 2019. After having played two seasons for ESV Kaufbeuren, Wörle signed a contract with EC Bad Nauheim, playing in the second German League DEL2. In February 2023, after receiving an injury to his shoulder, Wörle decided to resign from his career
