= Saint John the Baptist Church (Columbus, Ohio) =

Catholic church building in Columbus, Ohio, USA

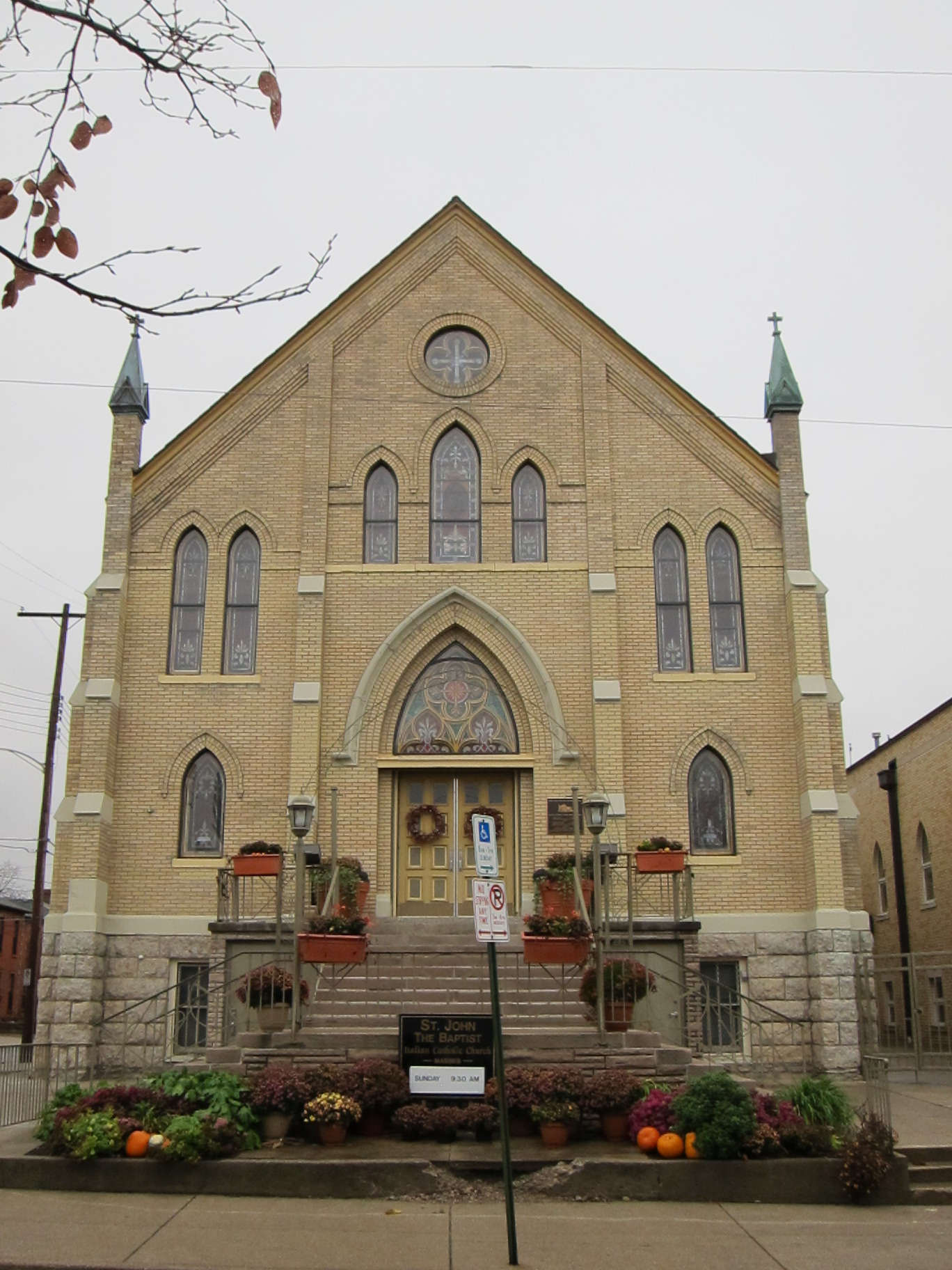
- The exterior of St. John the Baptist in 2011.
- Saint John the Baptist Church
- 39.9774°N 82.9906°W
- Location: Italian Village, Columbus, Ohio
- Address: 168 East Lincoln Street; Columbus, Ohio, 43215
- Denomination: Catholic
- Religious institute: Pontifical Institute for Foreign Missions (1949-1991)

History
- Founded: October 1896
- Dedicated: 18 September 1898

Architecture
- Architect: David Riebel
- Style: Late Gothic Revival
- Construction cost: $12,000

Specifications
- Capacity: 480
- Length: 104 ft.
- Width: 43 ft.

Administration
- Diocese: Diocese of Columbus
- Parish: Sacred Heart

Saint John the Baptist Church is a Catholic national parish church of the Diocese of Columbus located in the Italian Village neighborhood of Columbus, Ohio. The congregation was founded in 1896 to serve Italian-American immigrants and initially met at St. Joseph Cathedral before the completion of the Late Gothic Revival church in 1898. The church was staffed by priests of the Pontifical Institute for Foreign Missions from 1949 to 1991, and became a hub of Italian-American culture in central Ohio, founding and sponsoring the Columbus Italian Festival in 1980 as well as constructing an Italian Cultural Center in 1989. It has been jointly administered with Sacred Heart Church in nearby Victorian Village since 2022.

== History ==
=== Founding ===
The first immigrants to reside in what is now Italian Village were Irish immigrants, who lived in the area from 1850 to around 1870, but began to move out of the area as they became more successful. In the 1890s, Italian-Americans began to move to the area from Milo-Grogan and Flytown, attracted by the plentiful jobs available in the area. These included the Jeffrey Manufacturing Company, Berry Brothers Bolt Works, and Kilbourne and Jacobs Manufacturing Co. In January of 1896, Fr. Alexander Cestelli, an Italian priest from Fiesole, was hired by Joseph Jessing to serve as a professor at the Pontifical College Josephinum, teaching Moral theology. Cestelli eventually became interested in the spiritual welfare of Italian immigrants in Columbus, and by October of the same year, Bishop John Watterson asked Cestelli to take charge of the Italian Catholics of Columbus, who prior to this attended Mass at parishes throughout the city. Cestelli began saying Sunday Mass for Italian immigrants in the baptistery of St. Joseph Cathedral soon after, and continued to do so for two years. As the baptistery chapel prominently features a stained-glass window depicting the Baptism of Jesus by John the Baptist, it is speculated that this led to John the Baptist being selected as the patron for the church.

=== Construction of current church ===
In late 1897, Cestelli purchased a plot of land at the intersection of Lincoln and Hamlet streets for $4700 and began working towards building a church for the community. Throughout the construction and early days of the new church, John Marzetti was a frequent benefactor to the parish, donating $6,000 for its construction and continuing to support the church after its completion, auctioning off a parcel of his land to fund its operation, and hosting fundraisers for its benefit at his home. Ground was broken for the church building in the spring of 1898 and the cornerstone laid by Bishop Watterson on March 15. The brick Gothic Revival church was designed by Columbus architect David Riebel and cost $12,000. The pulpit, altars, communion rails, and confessionals were all constructed by the Josephinum Church Furniture Company. On September 18, 1898, Bishop Sebastiano Martinelli, the papal delegate to the United States, dedicated the completed church building. A convent to the east of the church building was completed in August of 1899. While most other parishes in the Columbus diocese at this time were territorial and established for specific geographic areas, St. John the Baptist was established as a national parish with no boundaries, instead serving all the Italian immigrants in Columbus. As a result of this, since the parishioners were scattered throughout the city, a parochial school for St. John was never founded.

In the construction of the church, as well as the adjoining rectory, the parish incurred significant debt, and the offertory from parishioners was small. In 1900, Cestelli requested that St. John's be given a portion of Sacred Heart parish, (in which territory St. John's had been built) so as to increase the income to the Italian congregation, which both the diocese and the pastor of Sacred Heart denied. The church property was held in Cestelli's name, the only parish priest of the Columbus diocese to hold church property in his own name at this time. The Italian priest was willing to relinquish the title of St. John to Bishop Henry Moeller only if Moeller would give him a pension. In February of 1901, Cestelli gave both the keys and title to the church to Moeller and then left the Diocese. Due to the debts of the church, it was in danger of foreclosure, as the Diocese was unwilling to accept financial liability for the building. The congregation began to fundraise to save the church from foreclosure, with Moeller himself personally donating $100.

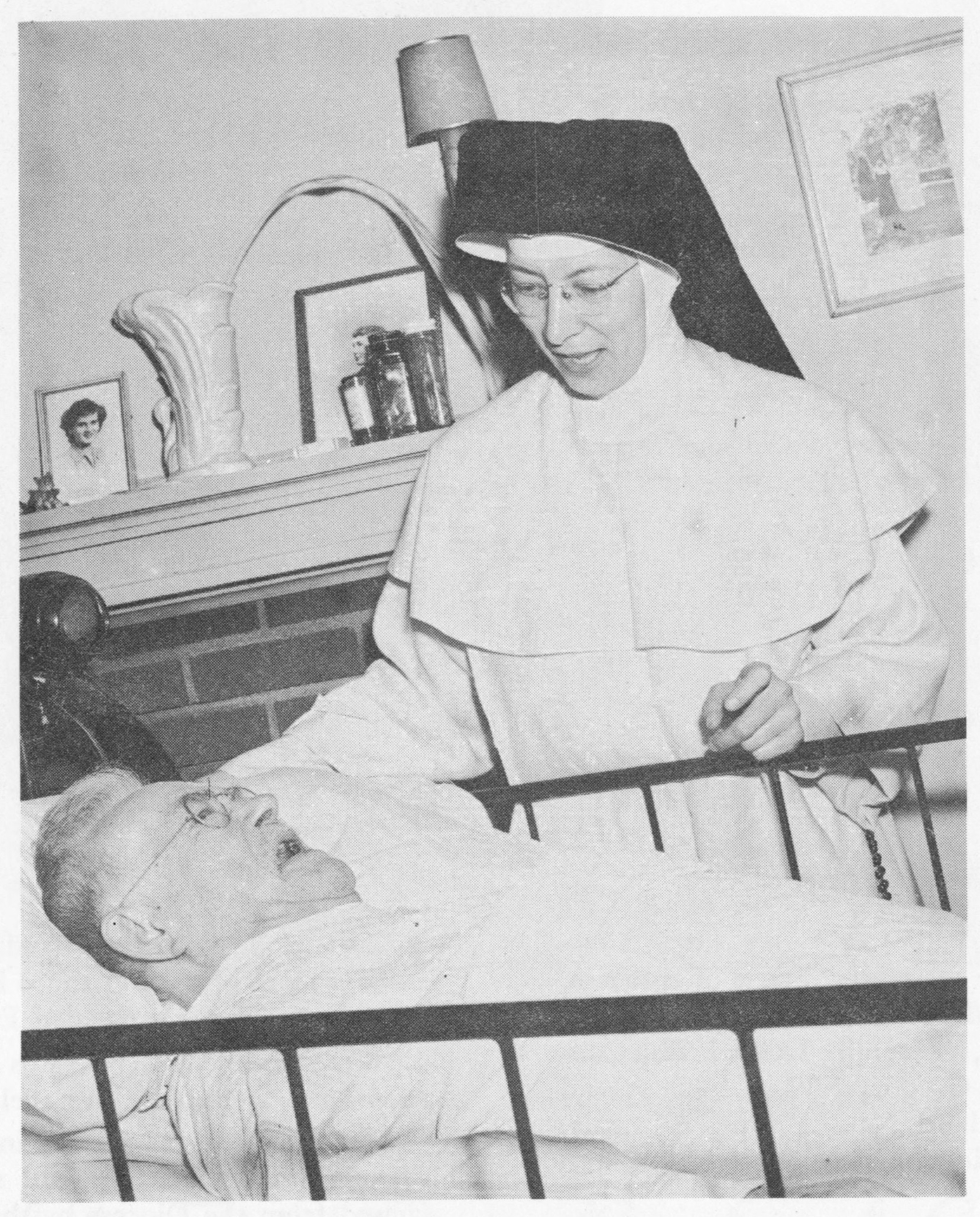
The Dominican Sisters of the Sick Poor lived on the St. John campus from 1912 to 1987.

=== Sovilla and Petrarca pastorates ===
Vittorio Sovilla, another Italian priest who had prior served Italians in Cincinnati, became the second pastor of St. John in March of 1901. He worked hard to pay down the outstanding debt, going door-to-door among his parishioners to collect offerings. Sovilla was a friend of St. Giovanni Battista Scalabrini, who visited St. John in 1901 and blessed an image of Our Lady of Pompei for the congregation. Sovilla was stabbed in the parish rectory by a visitor seeking advice concerning a marriage in 1911 but recovered. The Dominican Sisters of the Sick Poor established their Columbus community at St. John's convent -- eventually renamed to St. Rose of Lima Convent -- in November of 1912. Ongoing conflict between Fr. Sovilla and parishioners led to his returning to Italy in 1913.

The vacant pastorate was filled by Fr. Rocco Petrarca, another Italian born in Bordighera who had been serving in Springfield, Massachusetts before coming to Columbus in August of 1913. By this time, some Italian Catholics of Columbus had begun to settle in what would become San Margherita, attracted to the area by jobs in the stone quarries. Petrarca ministered to this community also, establishing a mission there that in 1922 became St. Margaret of Cortona, the namesake of the neighborhood. Petrarca also celebrated the first Mass following the dedication of St. Margaret Church in August of 1922.

An attempted burglary in 1945 was foiled by a homemade burglar alarm installed in the church by its pastor, who tinkered with electronics in his spare time. Among the Catholic churches of Columbus, St. John lost the most parishioners in service during World War II, at 15. Petrarca's health began to decline and in 1947 had to leave the parish. Bishop Michael Ready attempted to close the parish, but the congregation resisted and in August of 1948, Ready gave care of the parish to the Pontifical Institute for Foreign Missions, abbreviated PIME. Shortly after taking on the administration of St. John the Baptist, PIME also opened Saints Peter and Paul Seminary in Newark, Ohio.

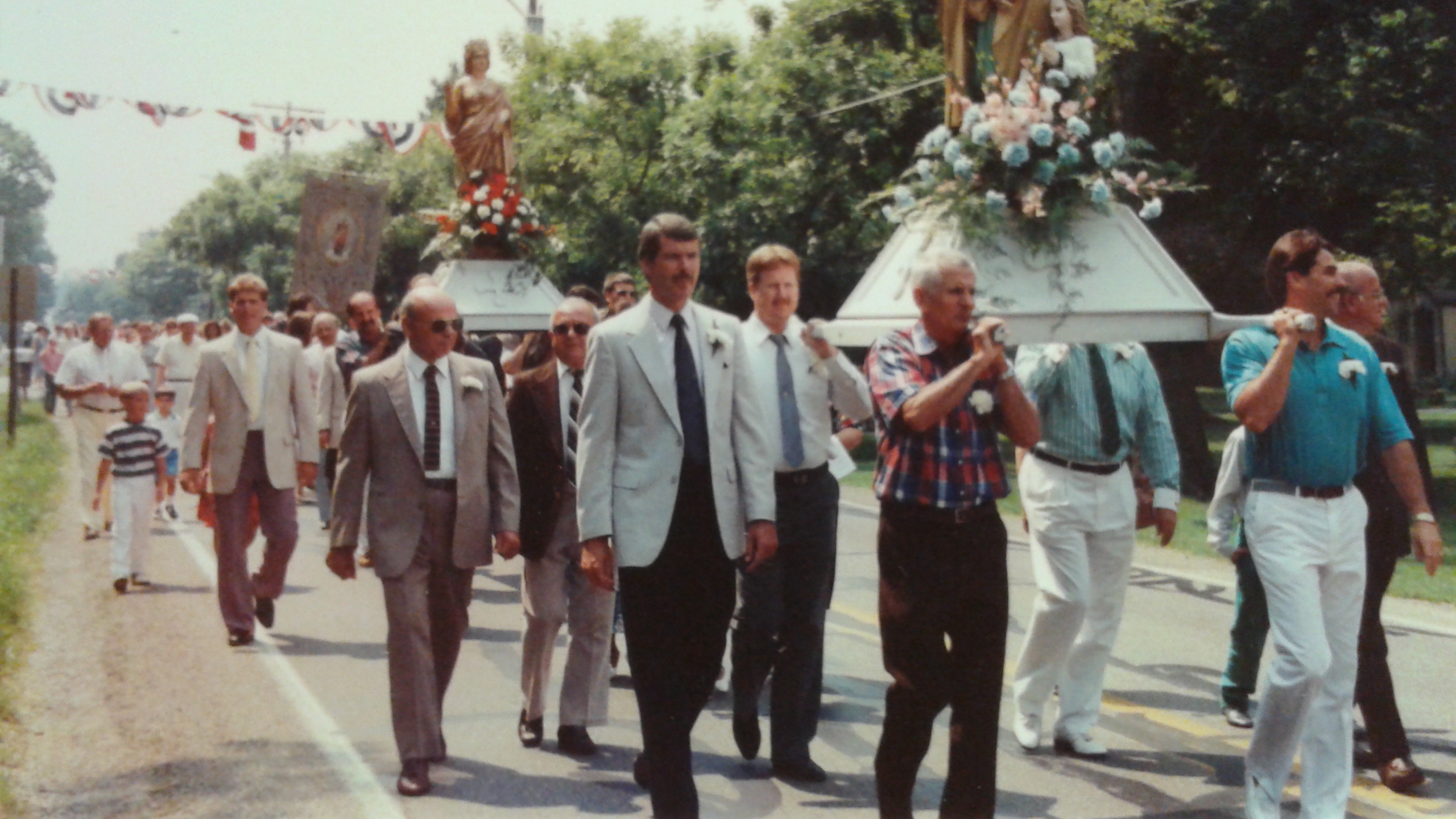
Parishoners of Saint Margaret of Cortona Church -- founded from St. John the Baptist in 1922 -- process with a statue of St. Margaret.

=== PIME administration and Columbus Italian Festival ===
In 1957, the basement of the church building was remodeled to serve as a church hall. The church was the first to host a series of all-night Prayer vigils that eventually spread to other churches throughout the Columbus area in following years. In 1980, Fr. Casto Marrapese oversaw the parish organizing the first Columbus Italian Festival, which attracted 8,000 people to the Ohio State Fairgrounds on September 1 and 2, requiring some attendees to be turned away. Marrapese stated the purpose of the festival was to allow Italian-Americans, their children, and their friends in Columbus a chance to experience Italian culture, as Italians in Columbus were losing their identity. Proceeds from the festival also funded college scholarships for high school graduates from throughout the Columbus area, with $60,000 being raised in the festival's first 10 years.

=== Italian Cultural Center and merger with Sacred Heart ===
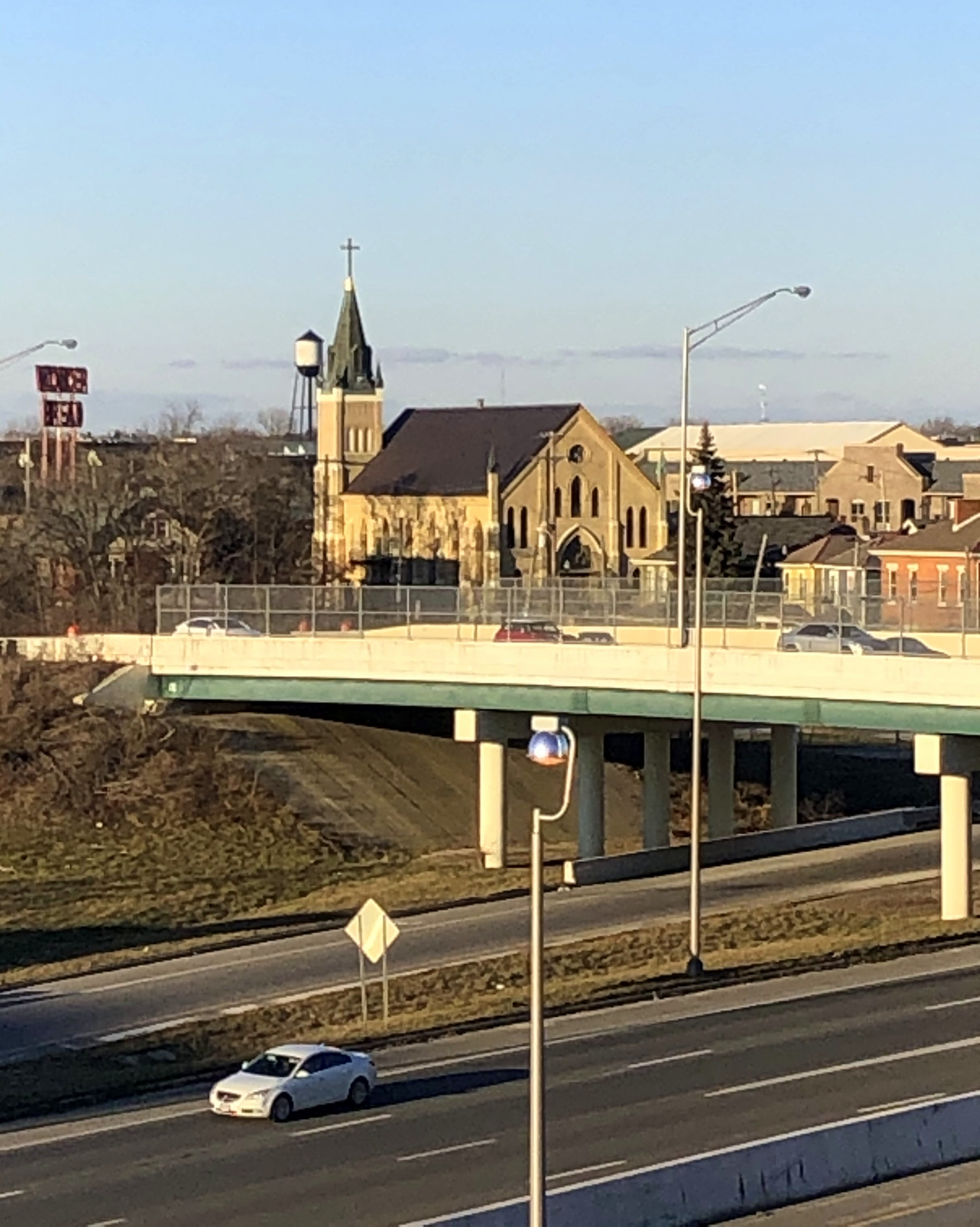
Saint John's as viewed from I-670.

Following the departure of the Dominican Sisters of the Sick Poor from St. Rose of Lima Convent next door to St. John in 1987, which had fallen into severe disrepair, St. John sought permission from the Italian Village commission to demolish the convent building to build an Italian cultural center and church hall in January 1988. The first two requests were denied but permission was granted for the third request in June, after the church agreed to reconstruct the old convent façade on the new building. The completed Italian Cultural Center was dedicated on October 29, 1989. Casto Marrapese, the last PIME priest to serve as pastor of St. John, retired in 1991, and a diocesan priest of Columbus, Mario Serraglio, was appointed as pastor of the parish.

Beginning in November 2022, St. John and Sacred Heart began to be served by the same pastor, an arrangement that has continued to the present. The following year, the parish began to host meetings of La Prossima in the Italian Cultural Center, a group for young people of Italian descent in the Columbus area.

== Traditions ==
The parish has maintained the Italian tradition of distributing blessed bread on the feast of St. Anthony of Padua. The church offers Italian language education courses, a custom that goes back to at least 1953.
