= Füssen =

- Town
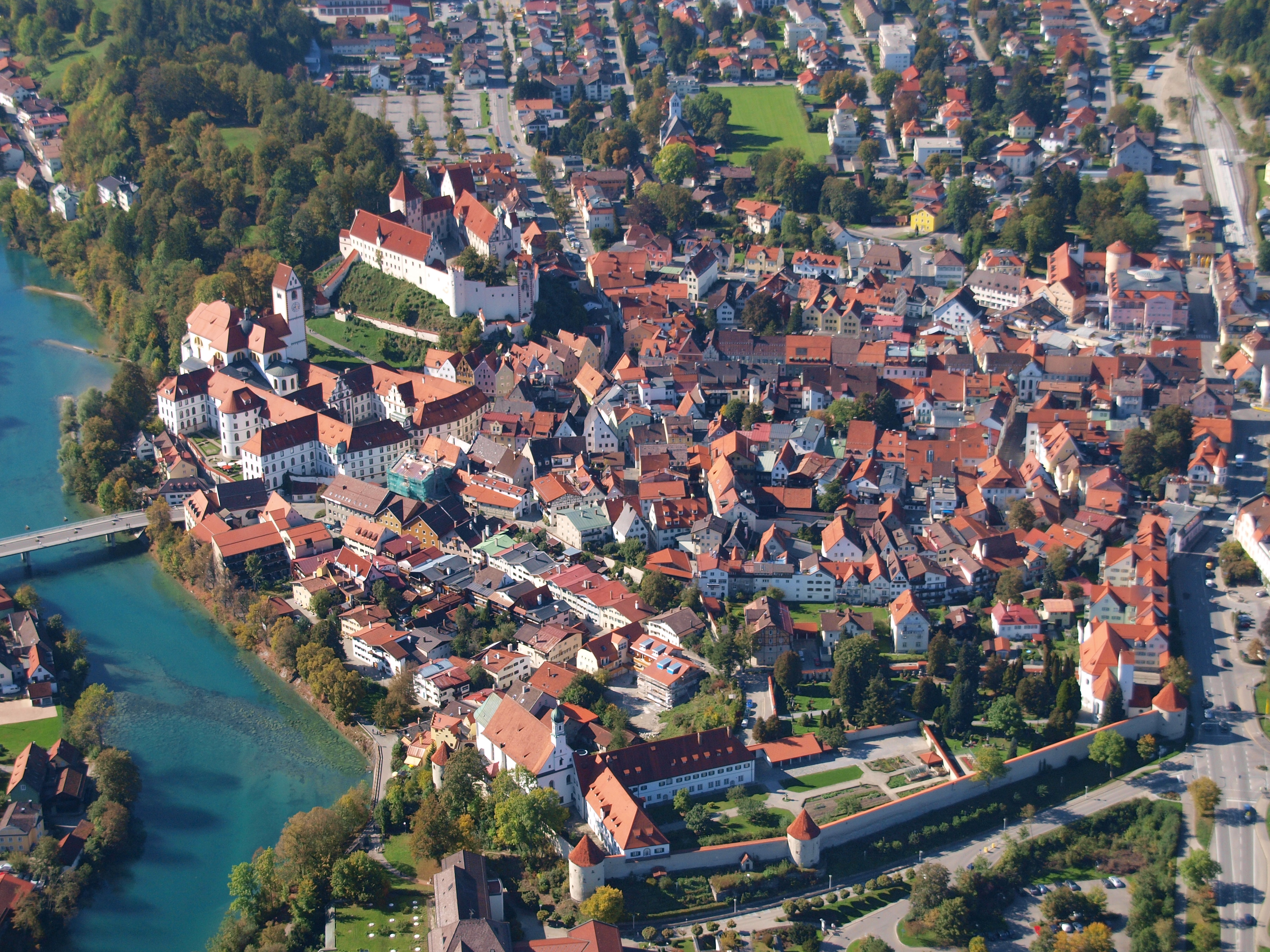
- October 2009 aerial view of Füssen

- Coat of arms

- Location of Füssen within Ostallgäu district
- Interactive map of Füssen
- Location within Germany Location within Bavaria
- Coordinates: 47°34′N 10°42′E
- Country: Germany
- State: Bavaria
- Admin. region: Schwaben
- District: Ostallgäu

Government
  - Mayor (2020–26): Maximilian Eichstetter (CSU)

Area
  - Total: 43.48 km^{2} (16.79 sq mi)
- Elevation: 808 m (2,651 ft)

Population (2025-12-31)
  - Total: 15,334
  - Density: 352.7/km^{2} (913.4/sq mi)
- Time zone: UTC+01:00 (CET)
  - Summer (DST): UTC+02:00 (CEST)
- Postal codes: 87629
- Dialling codes: 08362
- Vehicle registration: OAL, FÜS, MOD
- Website: stadt-fuessen.de

Füssen (German pronunciation: [ˈfʏsn̩]) is a town in Bavaria, Germany, in the district of Ostallgäu, situated one kilometre from the Austrian border. The town is known for violin manufacturing and as the closest transportation hub for the Neuschwanstein and Hohenschwangau castles. As of 2025-12-31, the town has a population of 15,334.

== History ==
Füssen was settled in Roman times, on the Via Claudia Augusta, a road that leads southwards to northern Italy and northwards to Augusta Vindelicum (today's Augsburg), the former regional capital of the Roman province Raetia. The original name of Füssen was "Foetes", or "Foetibus" (inflected), which derives from Latin "Fauces", meaning "gorge", probably referring to the Lech gorge. In Late Antiquity Füssen was the home of a part of the Legio III Italica, which was stationed there to guard the important trade route over the Alps.

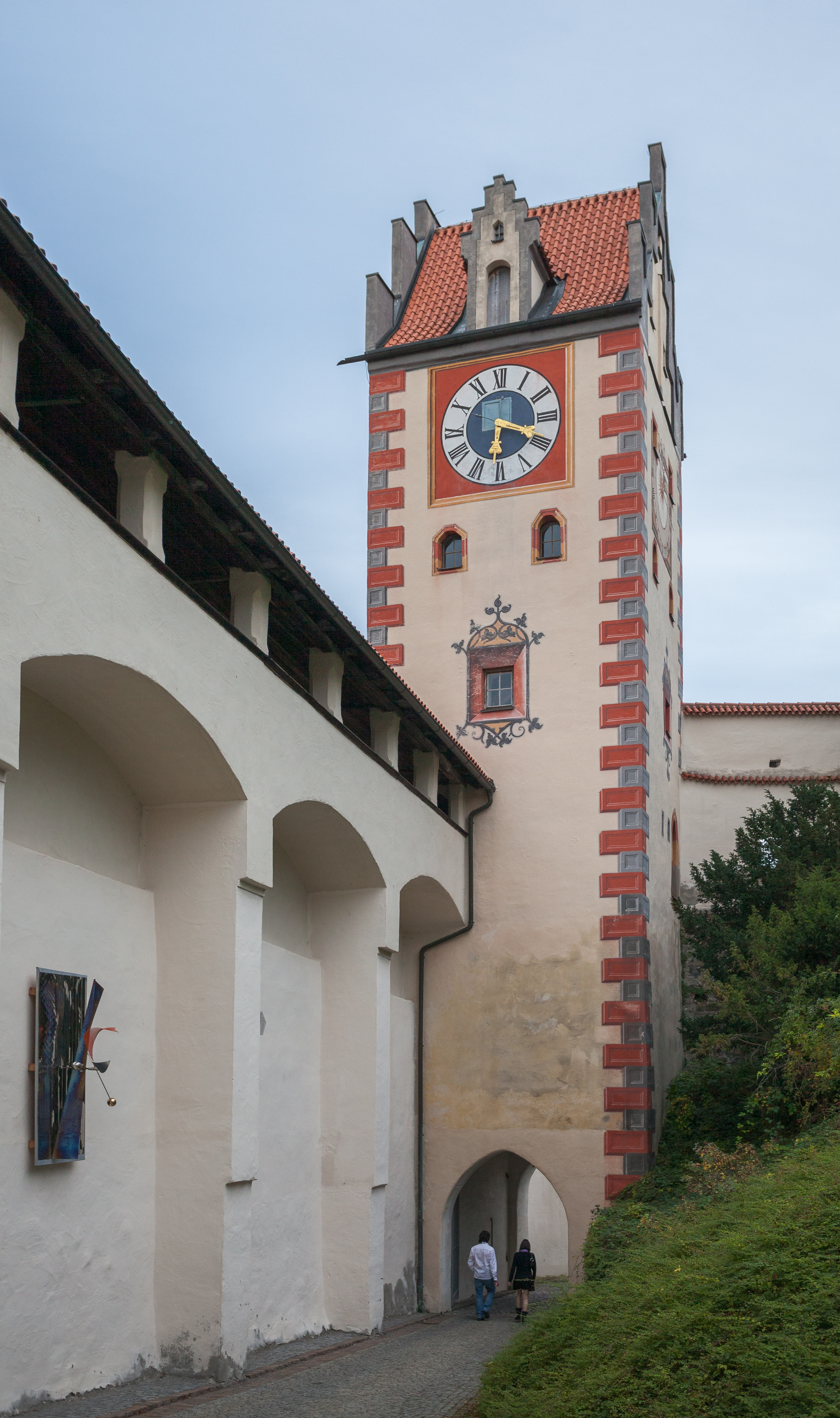
Tower of the High Castle

Füssen later became the site of the "Hohes Schloss" (High Castle), the former summer residence of the prince-bishops of Augsburg. Below the Hohes Schloss is the Baroque complex of the former Benedictine monastery of St. Mang, whose history goes back to the 9th century. Füssen has Saint Mang (Magnus of Füssen) as its patron saint. He and his Benedictine brother Theodor were two monks from the Abbey of Saint Gall and are considered to be its founders, in addition to the Monastery of Kempten. Magnus' original burial place was in the small chapel he built. His bones were transferred to the crypt of the church built in 850. Around the year 950 all his bones disappeared.

The canting coat of arms, depicting a triskeles symbol (alluding to the German Füsse "feet"), is based on a city seal used in the early 14th century.

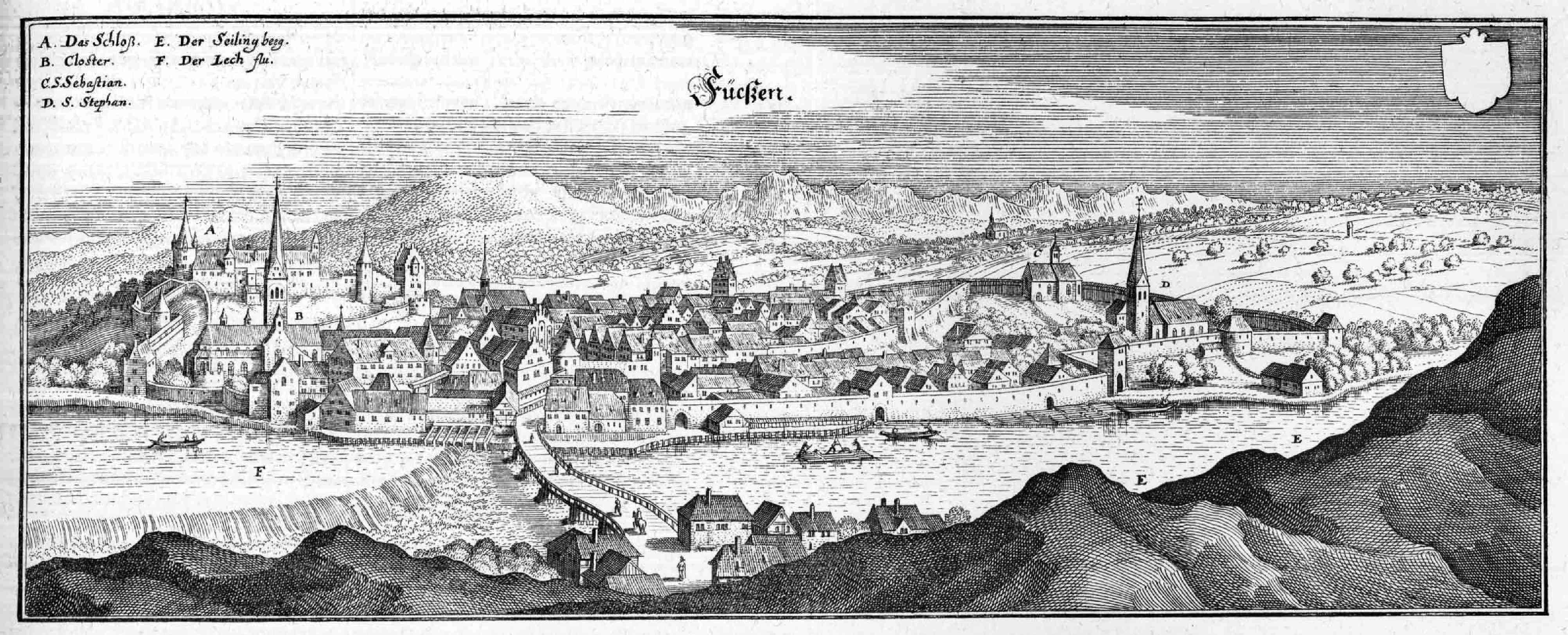
17th century engraving by Matthäus Merian, depicting Füssen

In 1745, the Treaty of Füssen was signed between the Electorate of Bavaria and Habsburg Austria, ending Bavaria's participation in the War of the Austrian Succession.

During the 19th century, composer Richard Wagner used to come to Füssen by railway when he visited King Ludwig II of Bavaria.

=== Recent history ===
Since the 1950s the town has been familiar to travellers as the southern terminus of the Romantic Road. Füssen was host to the 1988 World Junior Curling Championships.

== Geography ==
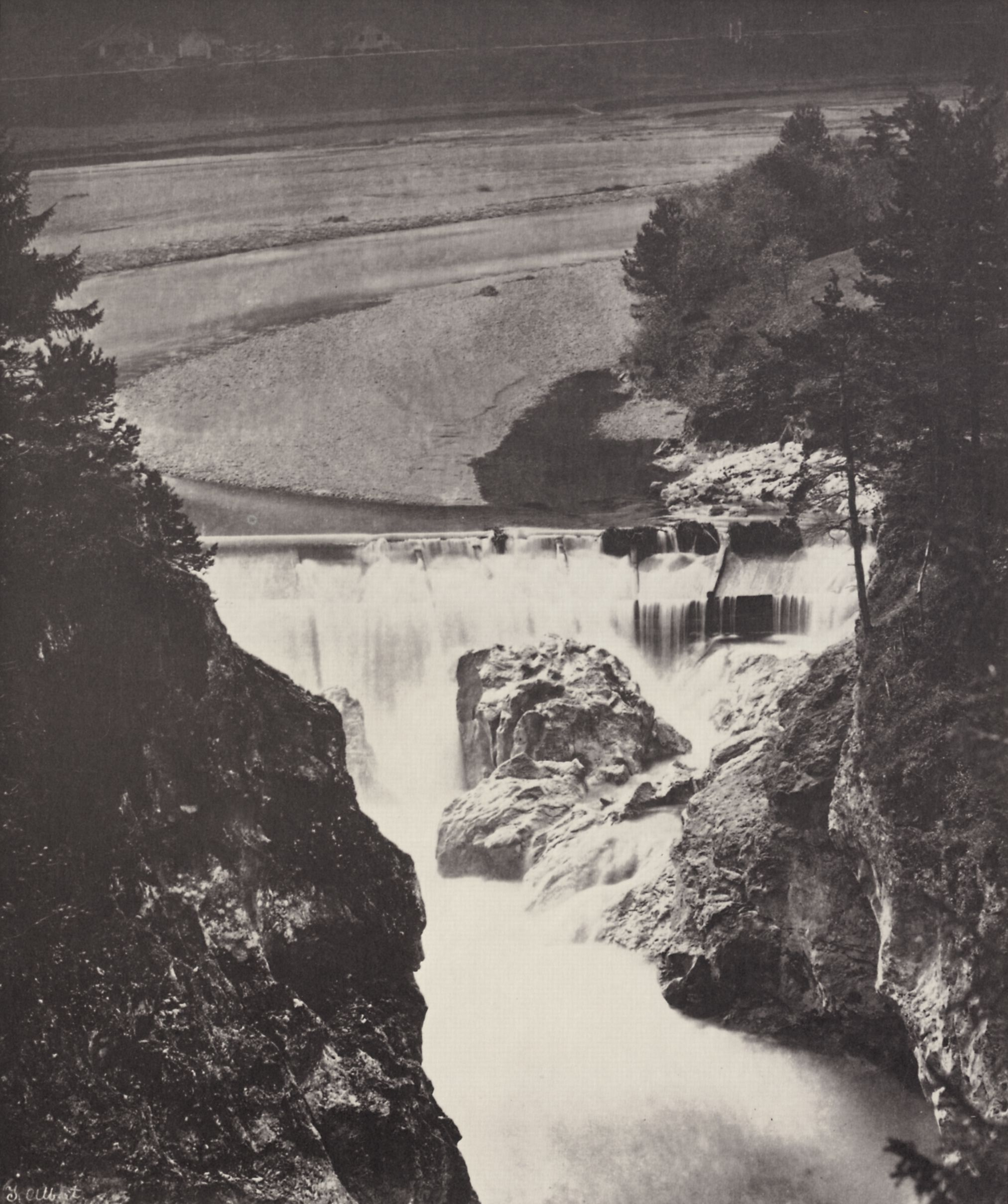
Lech Falls in 1857

Füssen is located on the banks of the Lech River, which flows into the Forggensee. The Forggensee is a man-made lake which was built to prevent flooding. It is the catchment area for all the melting snow in the spring, and is drained after the middle of October.

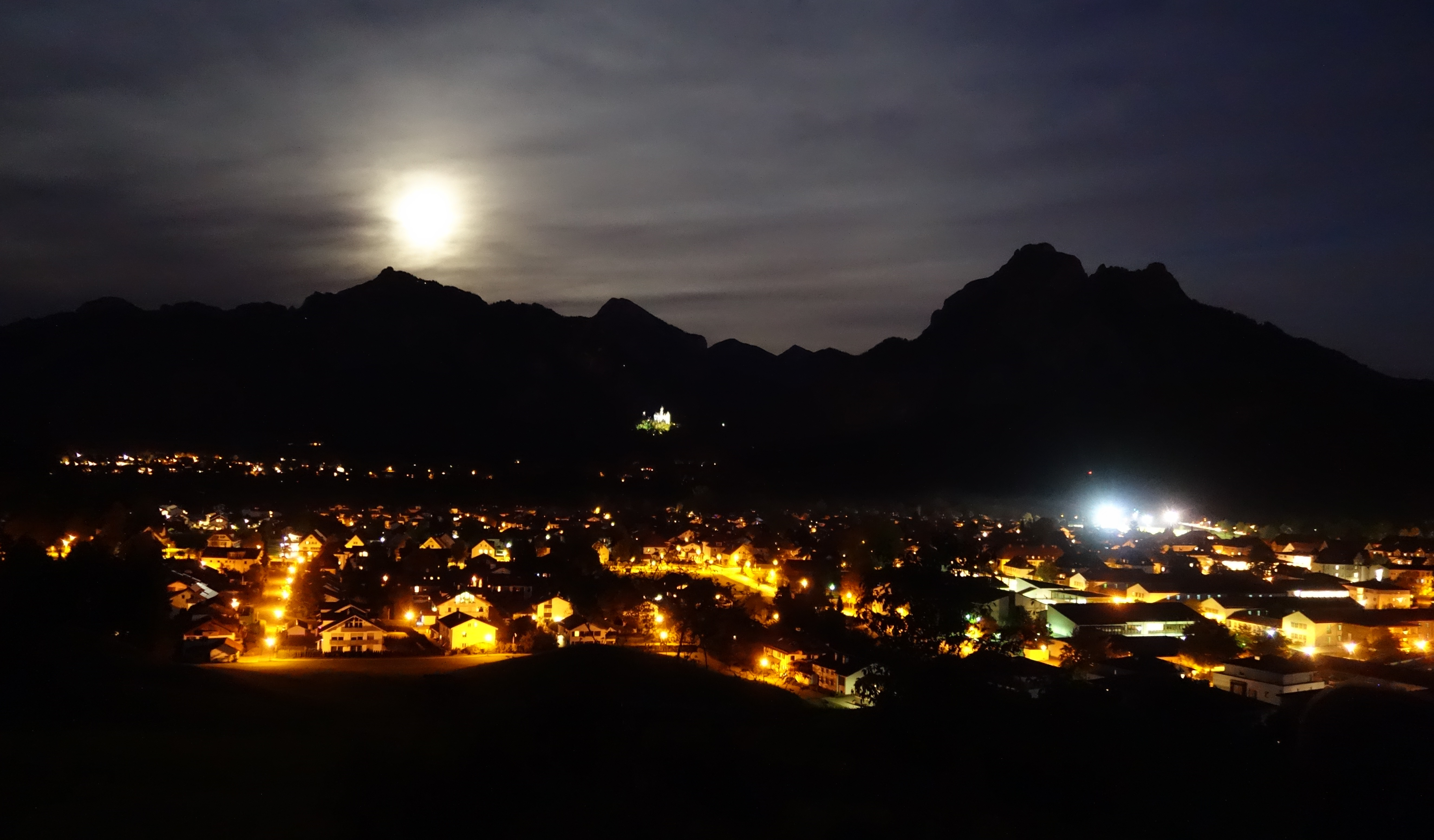
Füssen at night with Ammergau Alps-mountains Tegelberg (left) and Säuling (right); in the middle Neuschwanstein Castle

Füssen is 808 meters (2,651 ft) above sea level, surrounded by mountains of the Ammergau Alps. The castles of Neuschwanstein and Hohenschwangau are located near the town. Located at the 47th parallel north, Füssen is one of the southernmost towns in Germany, at roughly the same latitude as Seattle, Washington, United States.

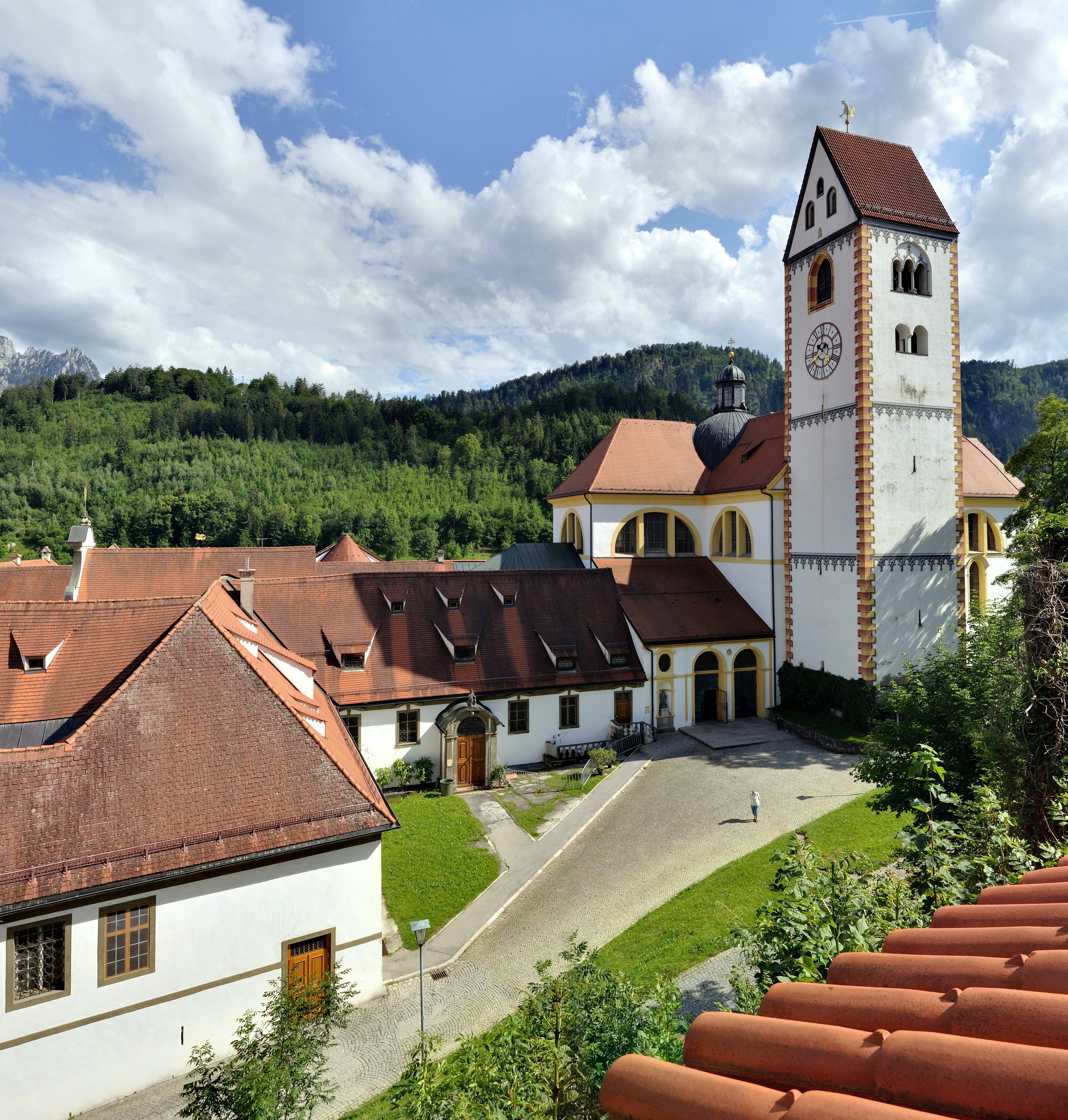
St. Mang Basilica

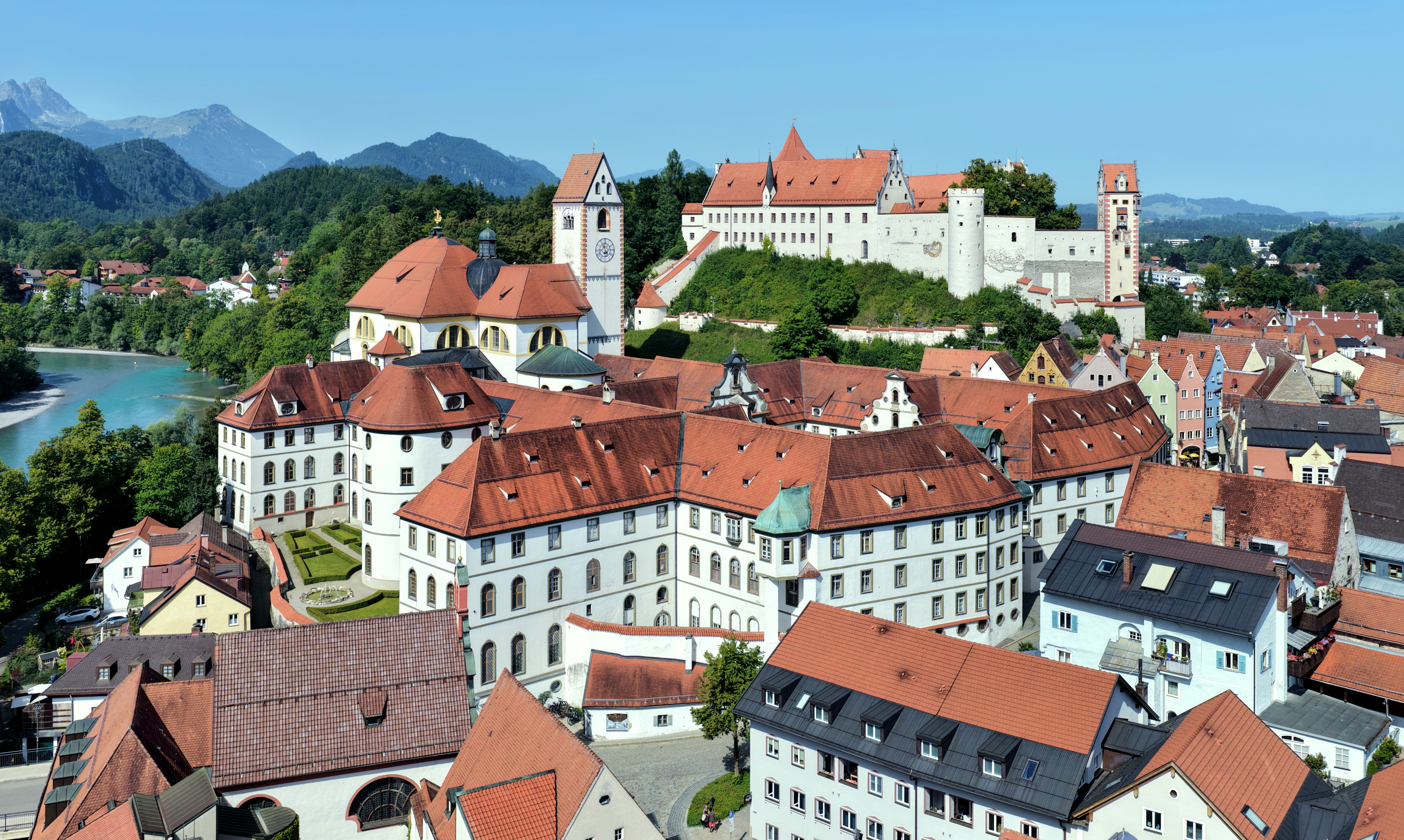
East view of St. Mang Monastery

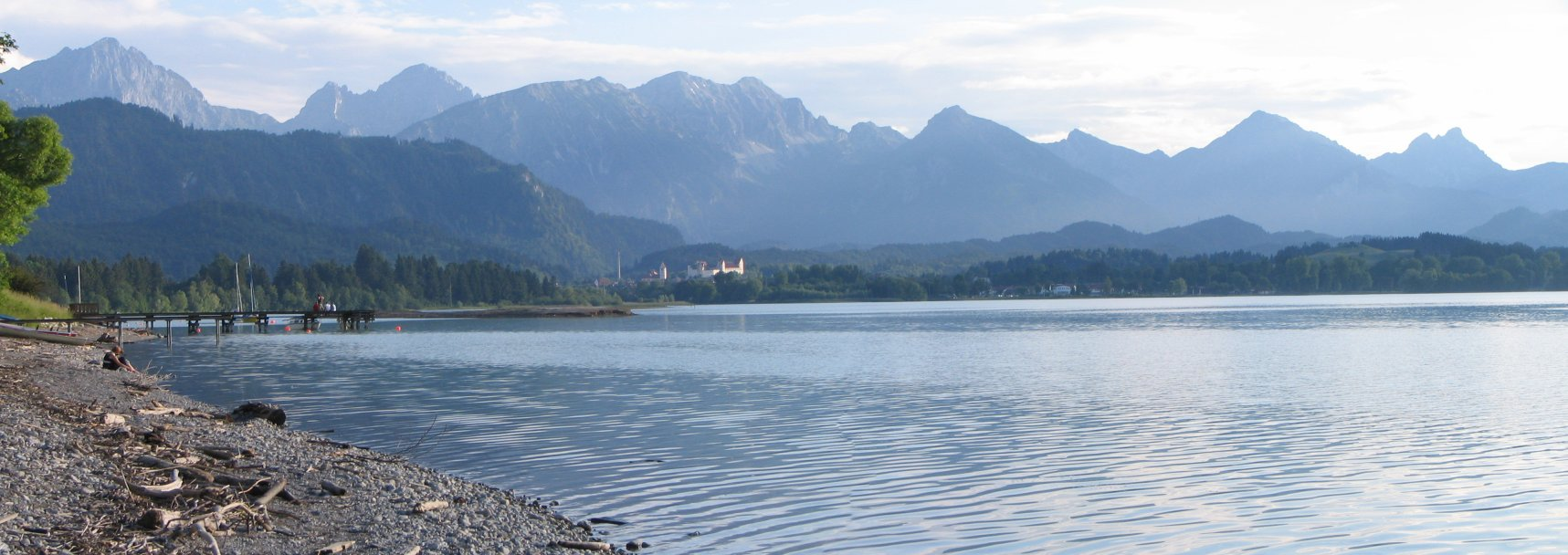
The Forggensee with Füssen in the distance

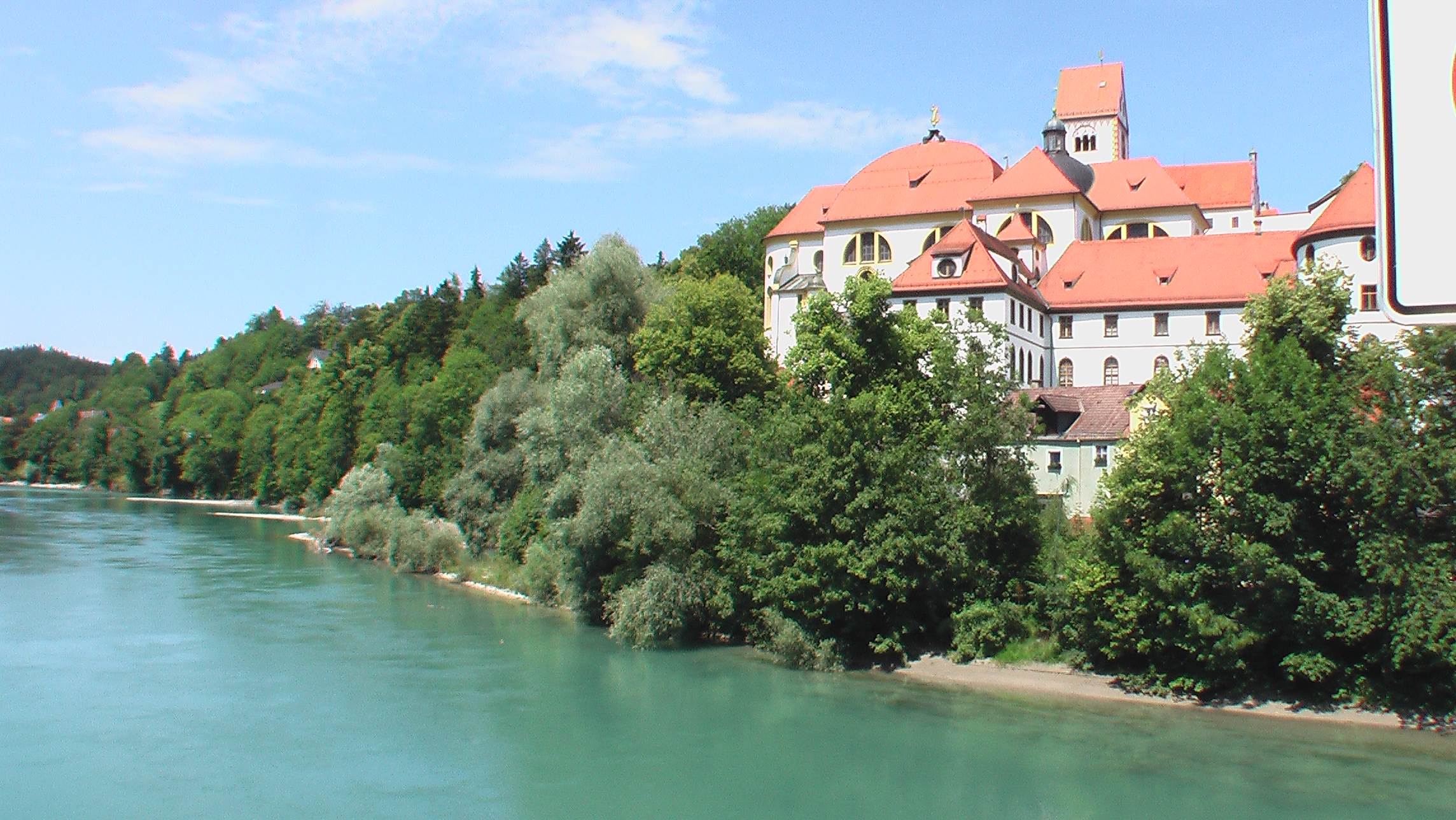
Füssen and the Lech River

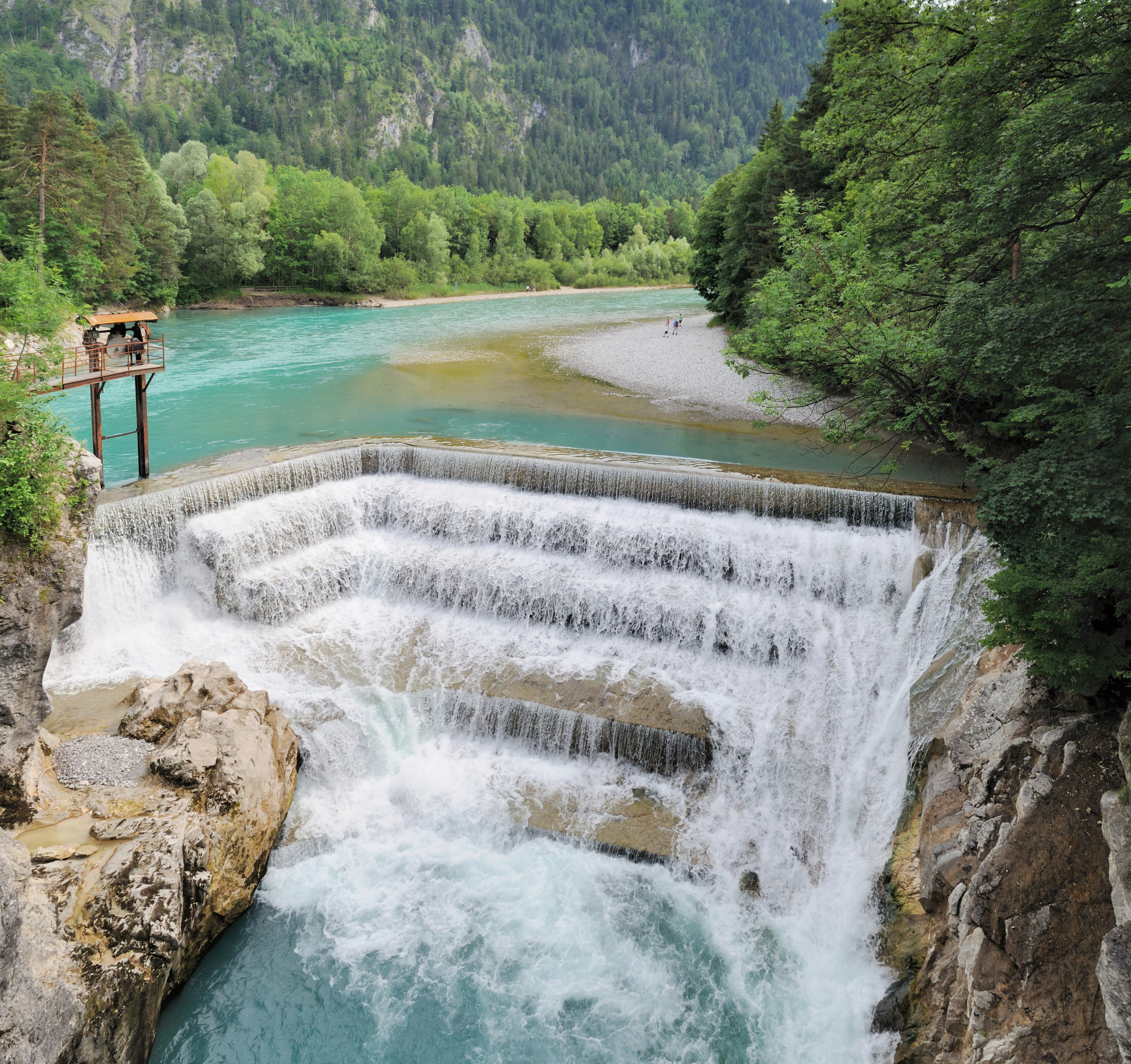
Lech Falls

== Attractions ==
The High Castle houses a branch gallery of the Bavarian State Collections of Paintings, which focuses on late Gothic and Renaissance works of art.

The oldest fresco in Germany can be found in the crypt of St Mang's Basilica. It dates back to about the year 980.

St Mang's Feast Day (6 September) is commemorated with a Holy Mass followed by a procession by torchlight through the old part of the city. During the week of the Saint's Feast a special 'Magnus Wine' is sold, with only 500 bottles produced.

Known beyond Füssen is the success of EV Füssen, the local Oberliga ice hockey club.

The Musiktheater Füssen is close to the lake Forggensee.

== Local media ==
The local newspaper for Füssen is the Allgäuer Zeitung, printed daily except Sundays and on Holy Days of Obligation. It contains a special section with news from Füssen and the surrounding towns and villages called the Füssener Blatt.

== Transport ==
The nearest airports are Memmingen Airport, located 83 km (52 mi) northwest, Innsbruck Airport, located 103 km (64 mi) southeast and Munich Airport, located 157 km (98 mi) northeast.

== Notable residents ==
- Paul Ambros (1933–2015), Olympic ice hockey player
- Oliver Axnick (born 1970), former curler and curling coach for the German men's team
- Johann Baptist Babel (1716–1799), sculptor
- Richard Bletschacher (born 1936), writer and former chief dramatic advisor at Vienna State Opera
- Patrick Einsle (born 1987), professional snooker player
- Michael Endrass (born 1988), professional hockey player
- Günther Förg (born 1952), painter, sculptor, photographer, and graphic designer
- Michael Greis (born 1976), triple Olympic gold medalist in biathlon
- Thomas Greiss (born 1986), National Hockey League (NHL) goaltender
- Anna Marie Hahn (1906–1938), serial killer
- Jennifer Harß (born 1987), goaltender and Olympian for the Germany women's national ice hockey team
- Uli Hiemer (born 1962), former NHL and Deutsche Eishockey Liga (DEL) professional hockey player
- Holger Höhne (born 1970), curler playing for the German national team and a medalist at several World Curling Championships
- Max Koegel (1895–1946), Nazi SS commandant of Lichtenburg, Ravensbrück, Majdanek, and Flossenbürg concentration camps
- Julia Manhard, freestyle skier representing Germany at the 2010 Winter Olympics
- Volker Prechtel (1941–1997), actor, best known for his roles in The Name of the Rose and several films by Werner Herzog
- Theresa Schopper (born 1961), politician
- Francis Xavier Seelos (1819–1867), son of the sacristan at St Mang's Basilica and a priest of the Congregation of the Most Holy Redeemer; he died in New Orleans and was beatified by Pope John Paul II on 9 April 2000
- Xaver Unsinn (1929–2012), Olympic medal winning ice hockey player and coach
- Tobias Woerle (born 1984), professional ice hockey player

== Twinned towns ==
Füssen is twinned with:

- Palestrina, Italy, since 1972
- Helen, Georgia, United States, since 1978
- Bardu, Norway, since 1997
- Numata, Gunma, Japan, since 1998
- Cremona, Italy, since 2018
- Airdrie, Scotland

== Climate ==
Climate data for Füssen/Reutte (1991–2020)
Month	Jan	Feb	Mar	Apr	May	Jun	Jul	Aug	Sep	Oct	Nov	Dec	Year
Record high °C (°F)	18.0 (64.4)	18.1 (64.6)	23.0 (73.4)	25.0 (77.0)	29.0 (84.2)	33.8 (92.8)	35.1 (95.2)	32.5 (90.5)	30.0 (86.0)	26.0 (78.8)	22.9 (73.2)	18.7 (65.7)	35.1 (95.2)
Mean daily maximum °C (°F)	3.3 (37.9)	5.2 (41.4)	8.4 (47.1)	13.0 (55.4)	16.4 (61.5)	20.2 (68.4)	21.3 (70.3)	21.1 (70.0)	17.6 (63.7)	13.3 (55.9)	8.1 (46.6)	3.7 (38.7)	12.6 (54.7)
Daily mean °C (°F)	−1.2 (29.8)	−0.1 (31.8)	3.6 (38.5)	7.5 (45.5)	11.6 (52.9)	15.0 (59.0)	16.8 (62.2)	16.6 (61.9)	12.6 (54.7)	8.8 (47.8)	3.6 (38.5)	−0.2 (31.6)	7.9 (46.2)
Mean daily minimum °C (°F)	−5.4 (22.3)	−5.4 (22.3)	−1.5 (29.3)	2.0 (35.6)	5.9 (42.6)	9.8 (49.6)	11.0 (51.8)	11.0 (51.8)	7.7 (45.9)	3.7 (38.7)	−0.8 (30.6)	−4.2 (24.4)	2.8 (37.1)
Record low °C (°F)	−25.4 (−13.7)	−20.8 (−5.4)	−23.0 (−9.4)	−9.0 (15.8)	−4.0 (24.8)	−2.0 (28.4)	2.0 (35.6)	1.6 (34.9)	−3.0 (26.6)	−8.5 (16.7)	−18.1 (−0.6)	−22.0 (−7.6)	−25.4 (−13.7)
Average precipitation mm (inches)	83.5 (3.29)	71.7 (2.82)	96.9 (3.81)	86.3 (3.40)	147.1 (5.79)	179.0 (7.05)	181.0 (7.13)	189.6 (7.46)	121.4 (4.78)	92.6 (3.65)	83.9 (3.30)	85.4 (3.36)	1,418.4 (55.84)
Average snowfall cm (inches)	60.6 (23.9)	59.6 (23.5)	43.9 (17.3)	16.6 (6.5)	1.2 (0.5)	0.0 (0.0)	0.0 (0.0)	0.0 (0.0)	0.0 (0.0)	4.8 (1.9)	33.5 (13.2)	54.8 (21.6)	275 (108.4)
Average precipitation days (≥ 1.0 mm)	10.8	10.2	12.2	11.6	14.6	15.9	16.1	15.0	12.3	10.5	10.6	11.7	151.5
Average snowy days (≥ 1.0 cm)	28.2	25.2	19.5	4.6	0.4	0.0	0.0	0.0	0.0	1.7	10.0	22.4	112
Average relative humidity (%) (at 14:00)	71.2	64.7	59.9	58.0	60.3	61.6	62.4	64.1	66.4	66.9	70.8	74.1	65.0
Mean monthly sunshine hours	105.5	107.0	140.7	153.8	191.3	170.0	186.0	186.5	163.3	139.3	92.8	81.2	1,717.4
Source: Central Institute for Meteorology and Geodynamics (sun 1971–2000)
