= Ebrach (Attel) =

River in Germany

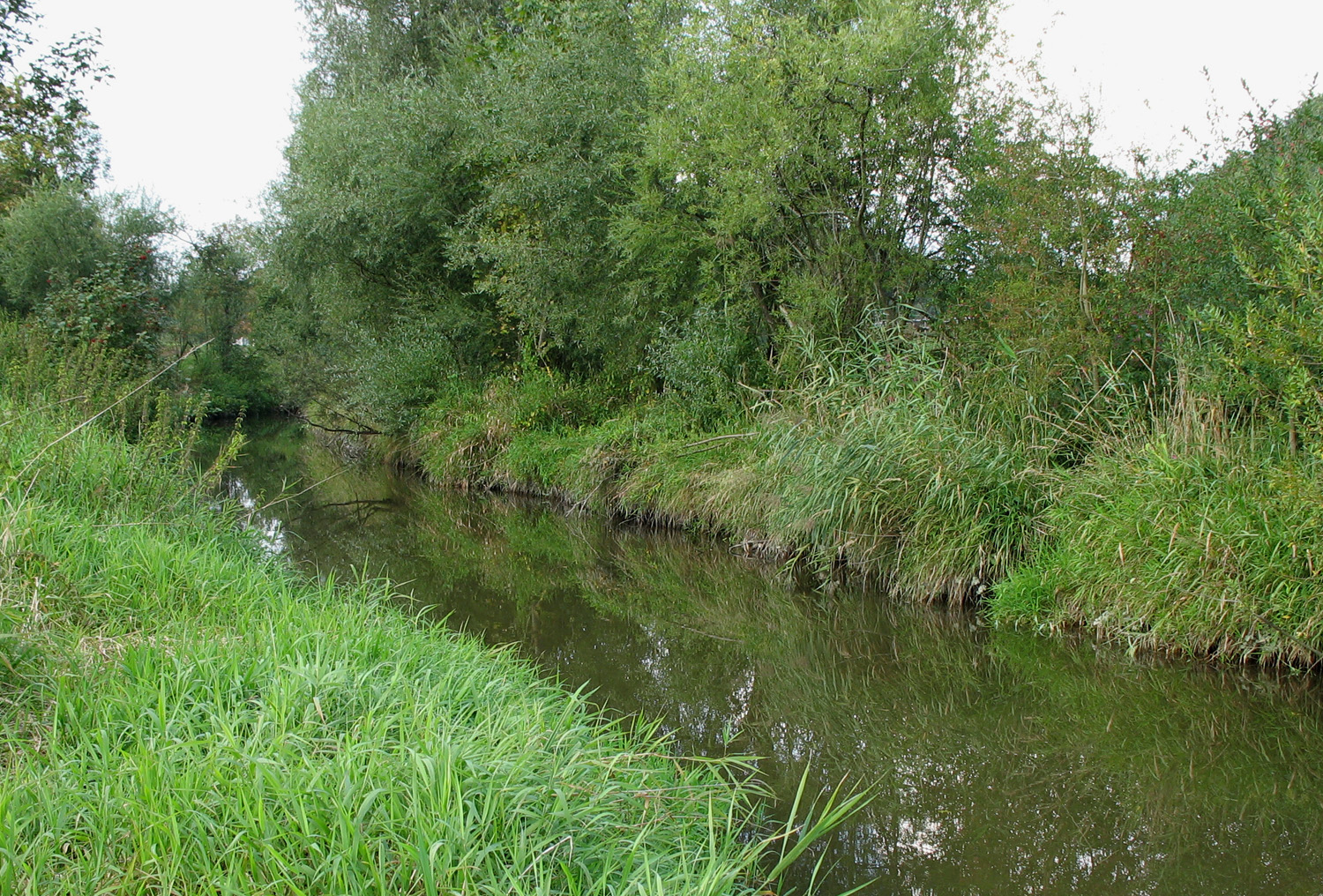
- The Ebrach shortly before its mouth, at Elend (part of Wasserburg am Inn)

Location
- Country: Germany
- State: Bavaria

Physical characteristics
- Mouth
  - location: Attel
  - coordinates: 48.0218°N 12.1722°E
- Length: 29.8 km (18.5 mi)

Basin features
- Progression: Attel→ Inn→ Danube→ Black Sea

Ebrach (German pronunciation: [ˈeːbʁax]) is a river of Bavaria, Germany. It flows into the Attel near Ramerberg.

== See also ==
- List of rivers of Bavaria
