= Ignaz Günther =

German sculptor (1725–1775)

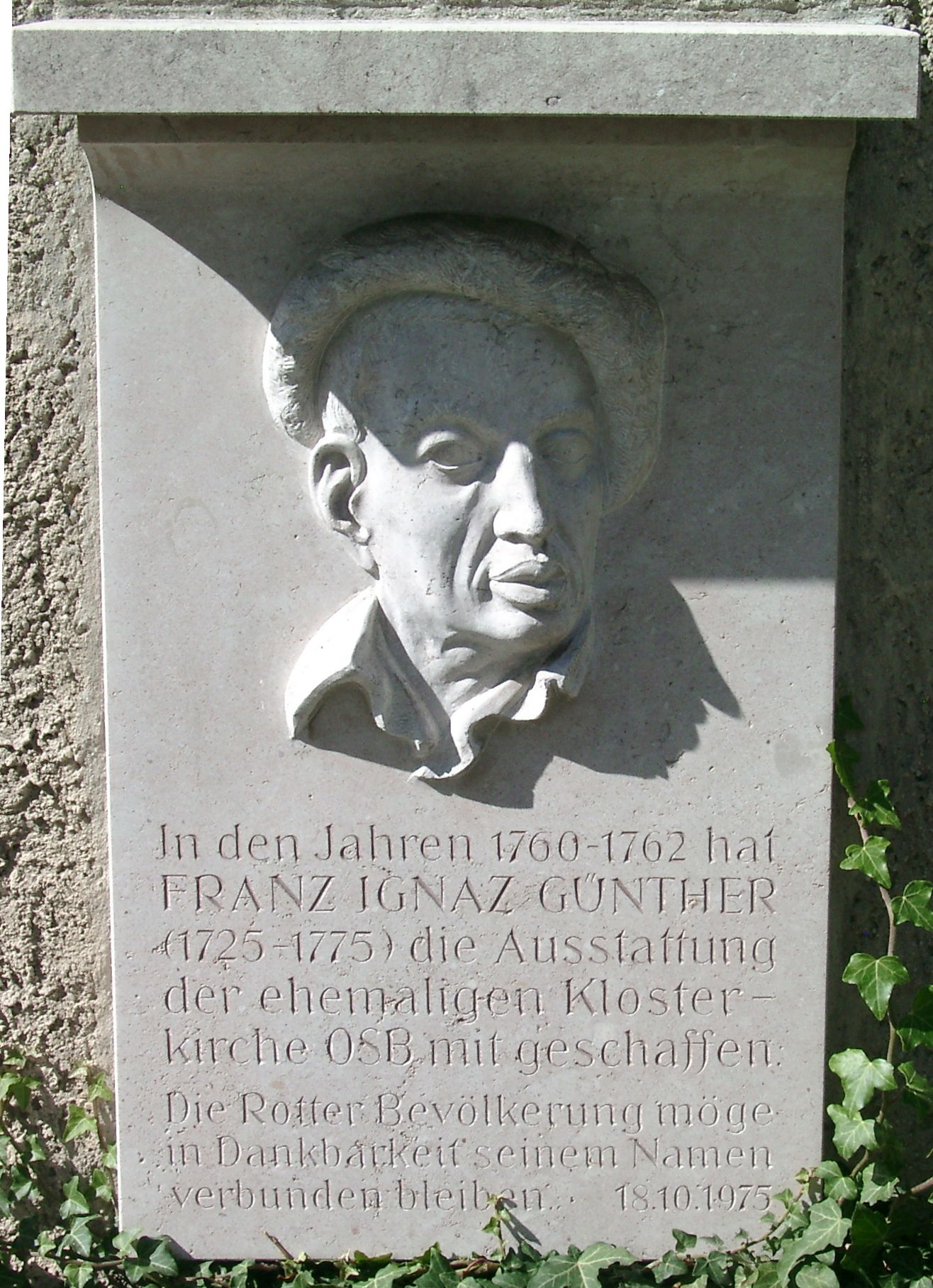
Memorial stone commemorating Ignaz Günther at the former abbey church in Rott am Inn

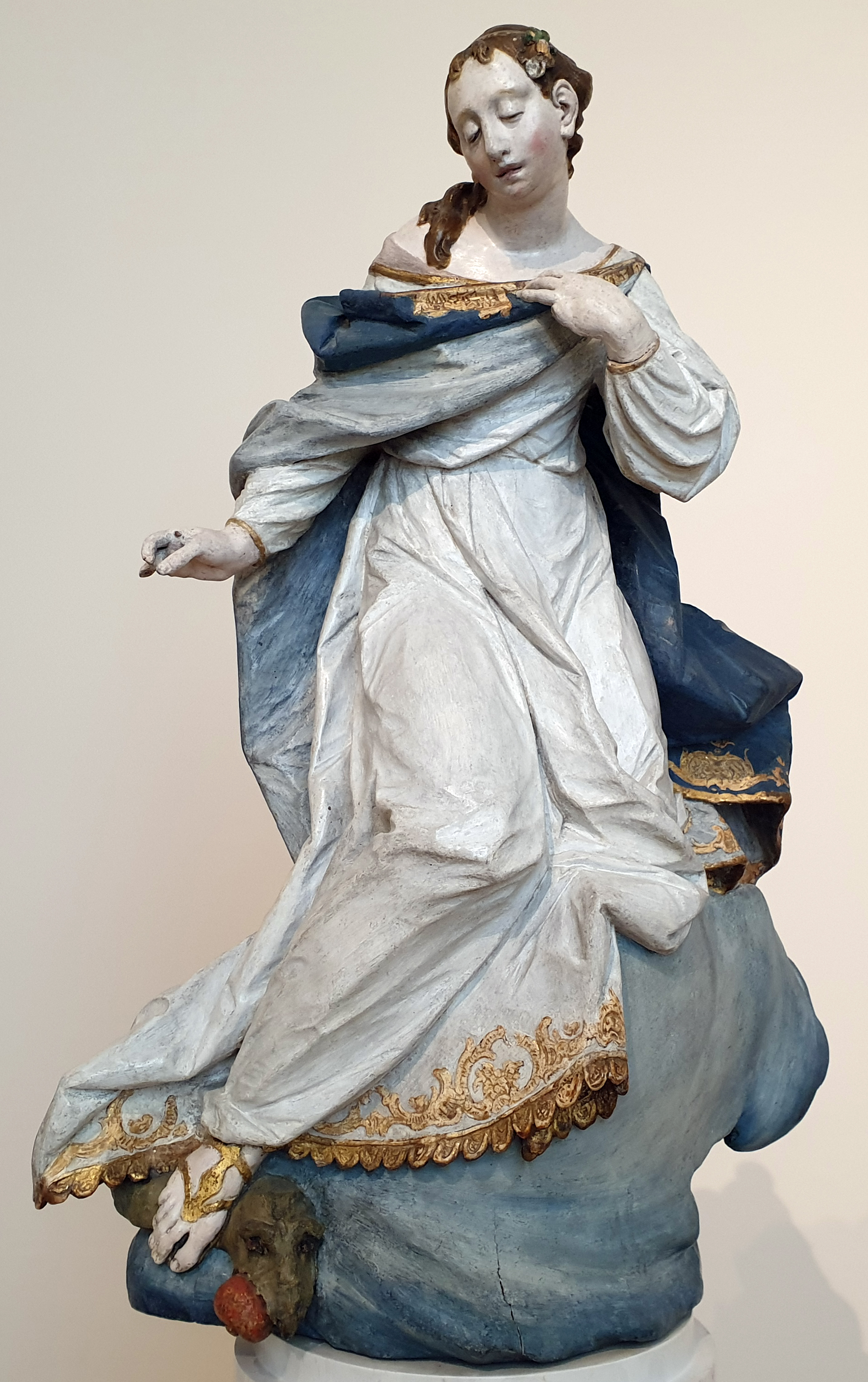
Günther's Maria Immaculata (ca. 1750/60), now in the Bode Museum in Berlin

Ignaz Günther (22 November 1725 – 27 June 1775) was a German sculptor and woodcarver working in the Bavarian Rococo tradition.

He was born in Altmannstein, where he received his earliest training from his father, then studied in Munich under the court sculptor Johann Baptist Straub from 1743 to 1750. His Wanderjahre took him to Salzburg, Olmütz, Vienna, and Mannheim, where he studied with Paul Egell from 1751 to 1752. Between May and October 1753, he was enrolled in the Vienna Academy of Fine Arts and won the annual students' competition. In 1754, he started his own workshop in Munich, where he remained until his death in 1775.

He is best remembered for his work in churches, especially his altars.

A wooden crucifix styled by Günther was given by the official Bavarian civil and ecclesiastical delegation as an 85th birthday gift to Pope Benedict XVI, a native of Bavaria, on Monday 16 April 2012.

== Major works ==
- Altmannstein—Church of the Holy Cross (1763–1764)
- Aschau im Chiemgau—Gallery of Ancestors in Burg Hohenaschau (two wooden statues) (1766)
- Benediktbeuern—Church of St. Benedict (side altars, attributed)
- Freising—Neustift Abbey Church (high altar) (1756)
- Gmund am Tegernsee—Parish Church of St. Ägidius (gilded wooden relief on north side altar) (1763)
- Greisstätt-Altenhohenau—Monastery Church of St. Peter and St. Paul (altars) (1767)
- Ingolstadt—Minorite Church (Preysing epitaph) (1770)
- Mallersdorf—Mallersdorf Abbey (high altar) (1768–1770)
- Munich—Bürgersaalkirche (guardian angels under the organ gallery) (1762)
- Munich—Pieces in the Bavarian National Museum, including his Hausmadonna for private devotion
- München-Harlaching—Pilgrimage Church of St. Anna (altars) (1763&1764)
- Nenningen—Cemetery Chapel (Pietà—last known work of Günther) (1774)
- Rott am Inn—Benedictine Abbey Church of St. Marinus and St. Anianus) (high altar, side altars, and figures of the Trinity, Saint Kunigunde, Saint Henry, Saint Corbinian and Saint Ulrich) (1761–1762)
- Starnberg—St. Joseph's Church (high altar) (1766–1768)
- Weyarn—Catholic Parish Church of St. Peter and St. Paul (woodcarving on high altar, including Annunciation, Pietà, putti, the carved shrine of Saint Valerius, and silver-framed tabernacle) (1763–1764)

== Bibliography ==
- Christiane Hertel, Pygmalion in Bavaria: The Sculptor Ignaz Günther and Eighteenth-Century Aesthetic Art Theory (University Park, PA, 2011).
