= Rott Abbey =

Monastery in Rott am Inn, Germany

Coordinates: 47°58′57″N 12°07′45″E

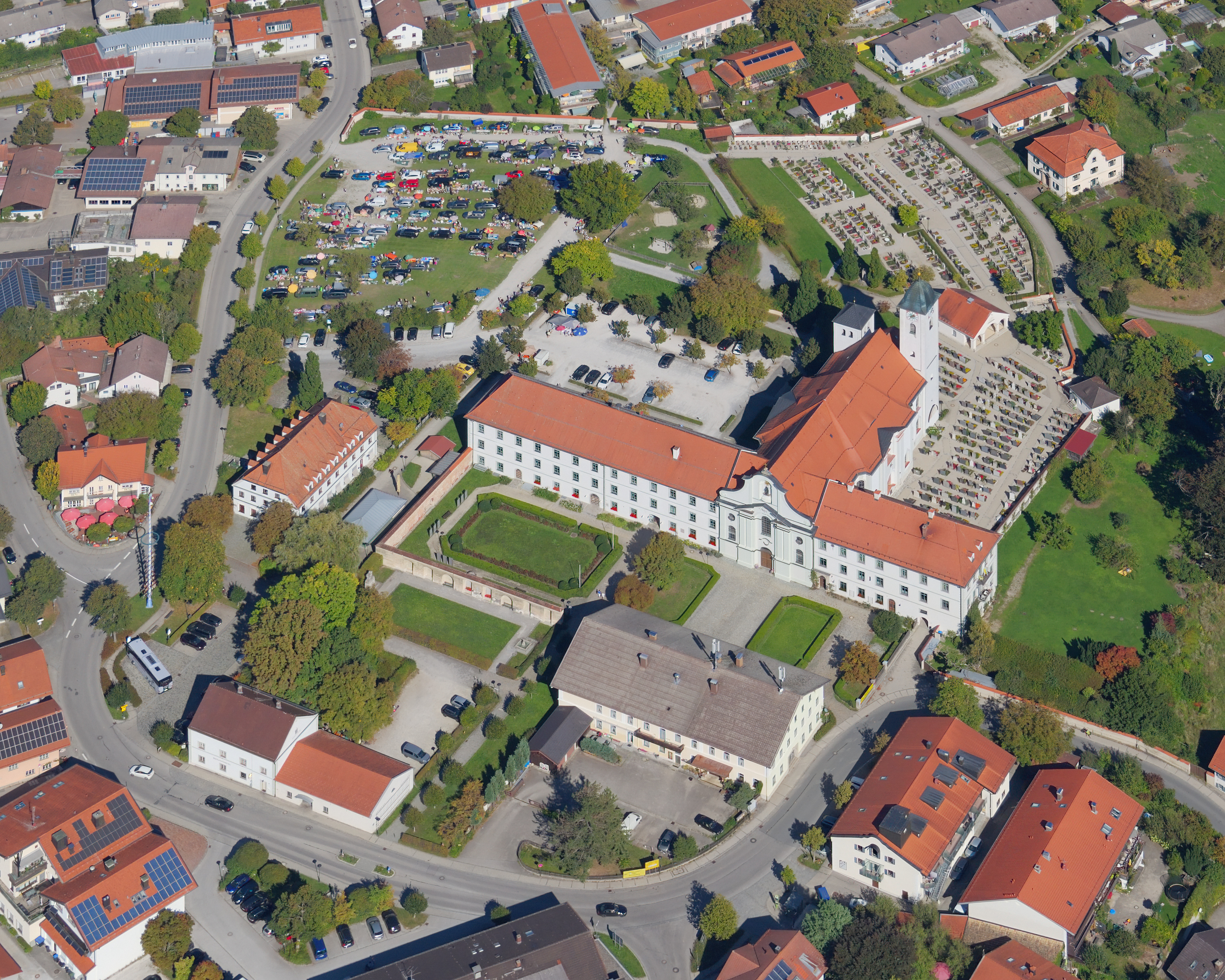
Aerial view of Rott Abbey

Rott Abbey (German: Kloster Rott) was a Benedictine monastery in Rott am Inn in Bavaria, Germany.

== History ==
The monastery, dedicated to Saints Marinus and Anianus, was founded in the late 11th century by Count Kuno of Rott (d. 1086).

After it was dissolved in 1803 in the secularisation of Bavaria, the buildings were sold off to various private owners and largely demolished. The Rococo church however still remains.

== Burials ==
- Ignaz Günther

Abbey Rott am Inn

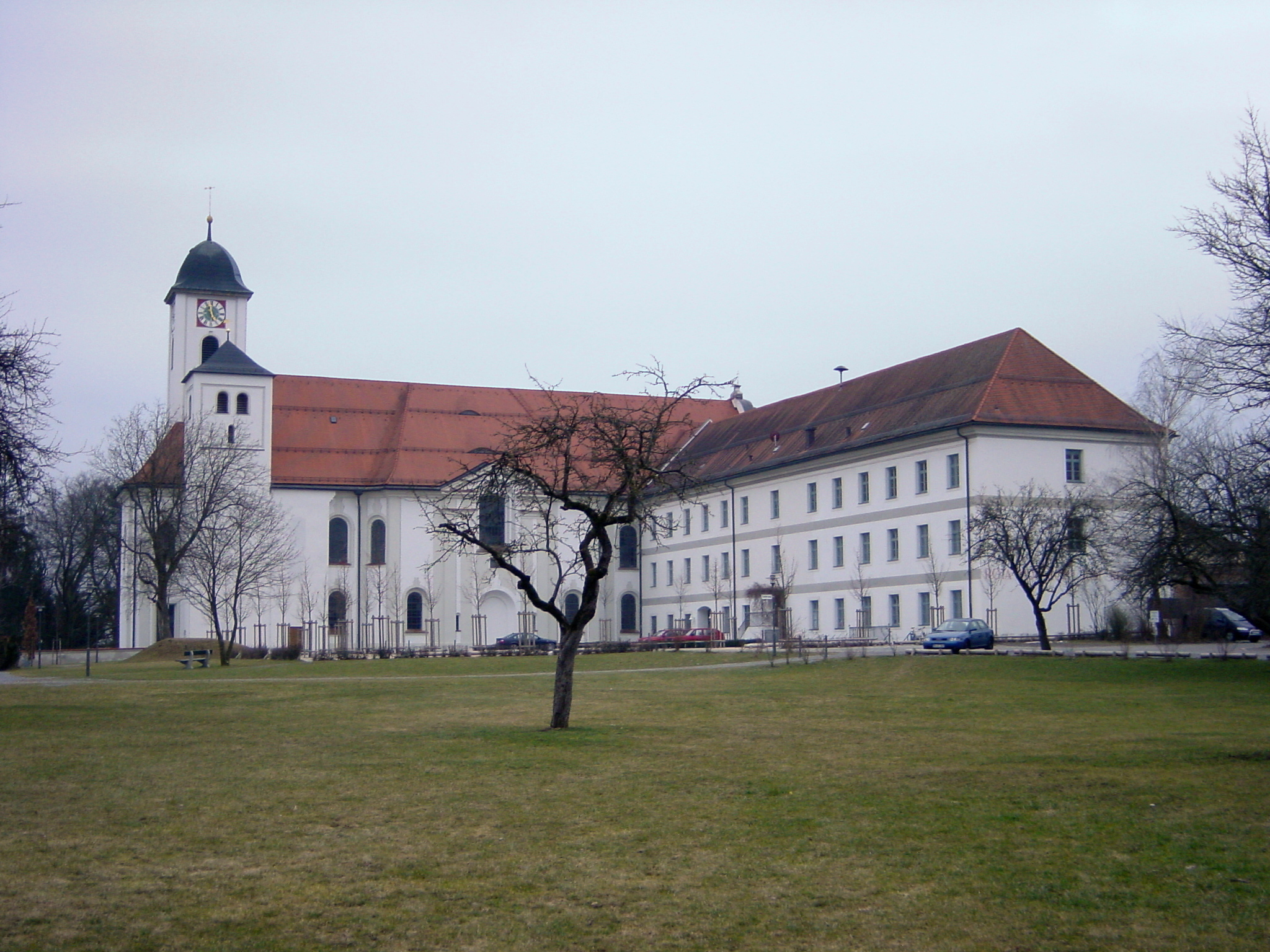

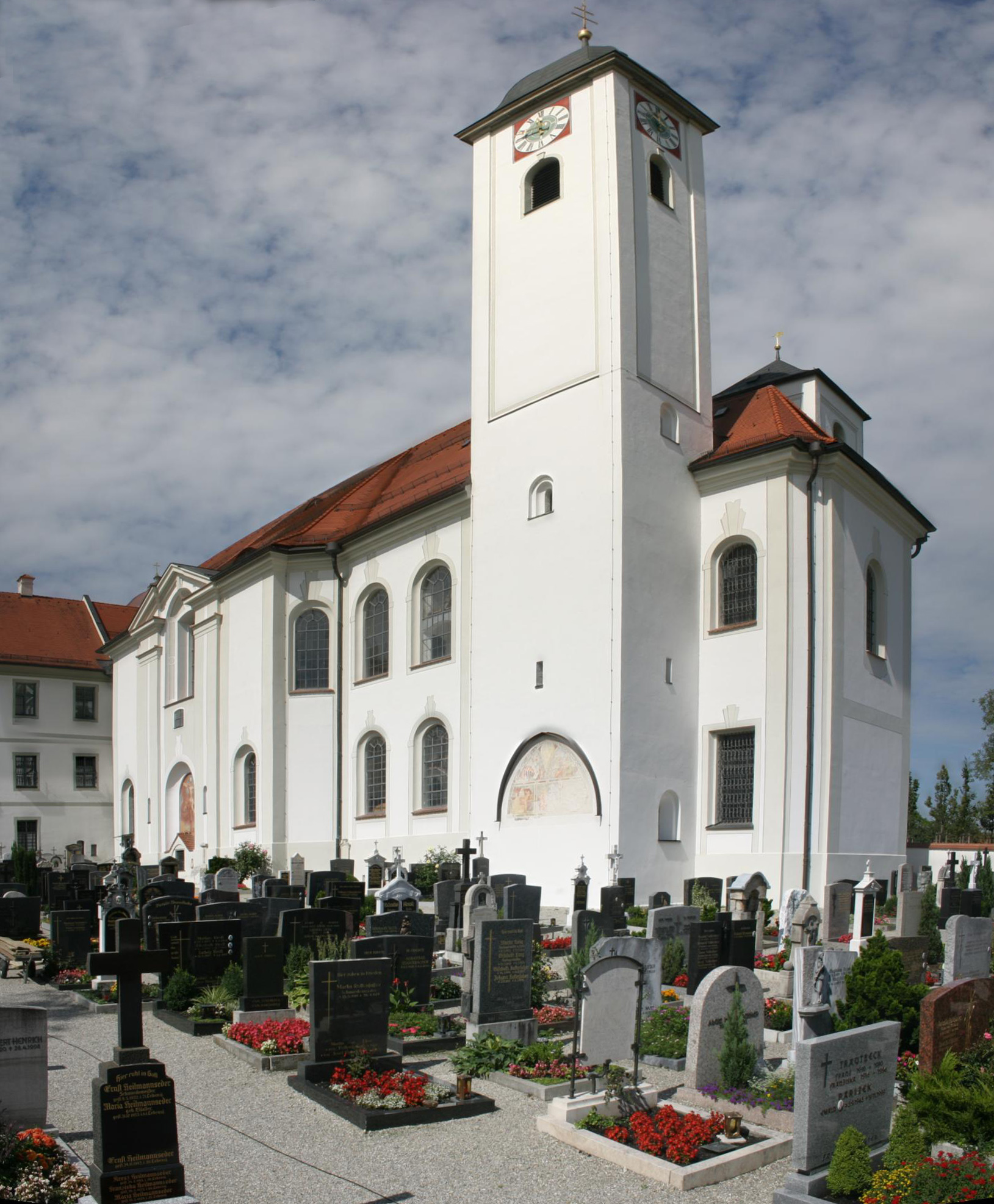

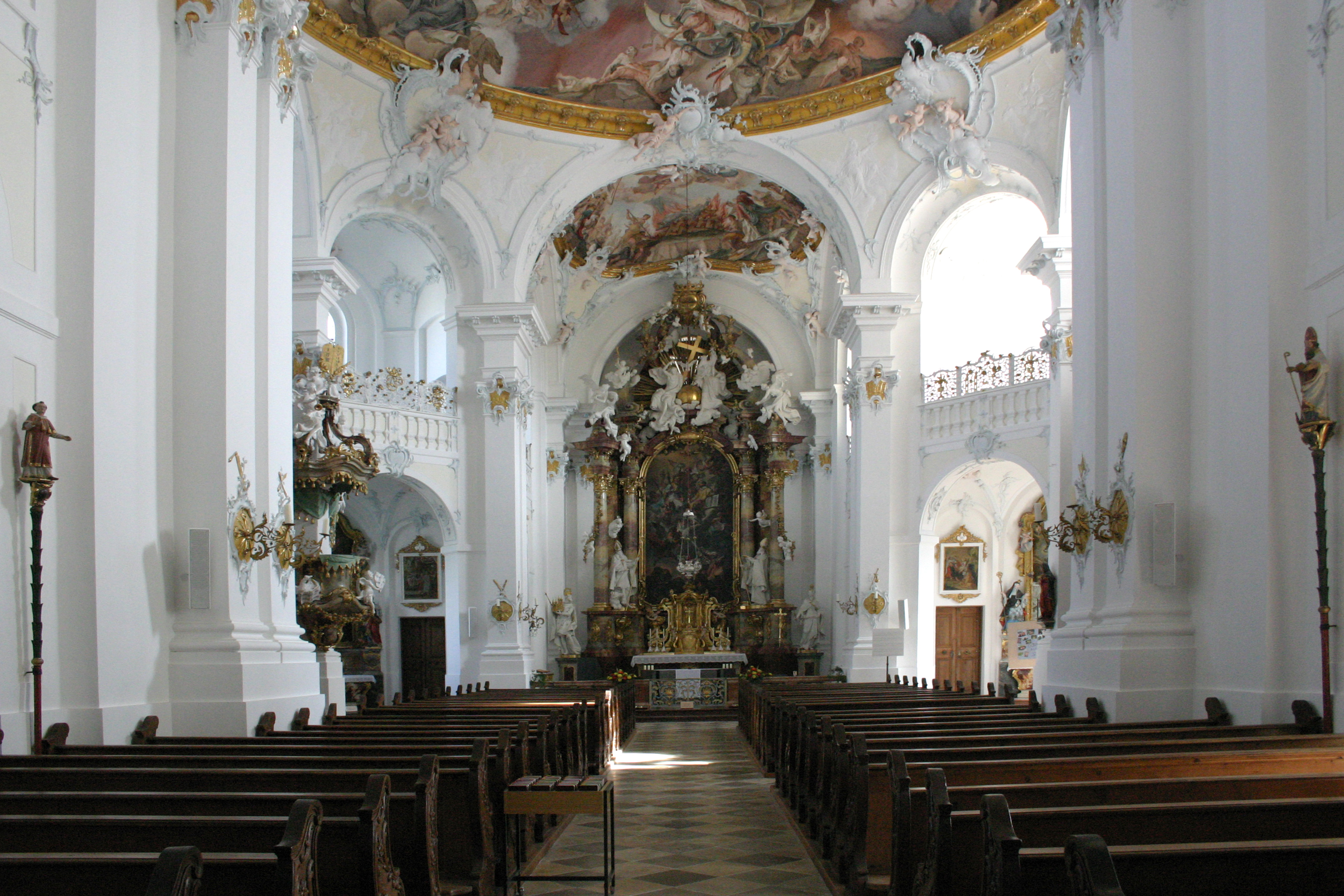

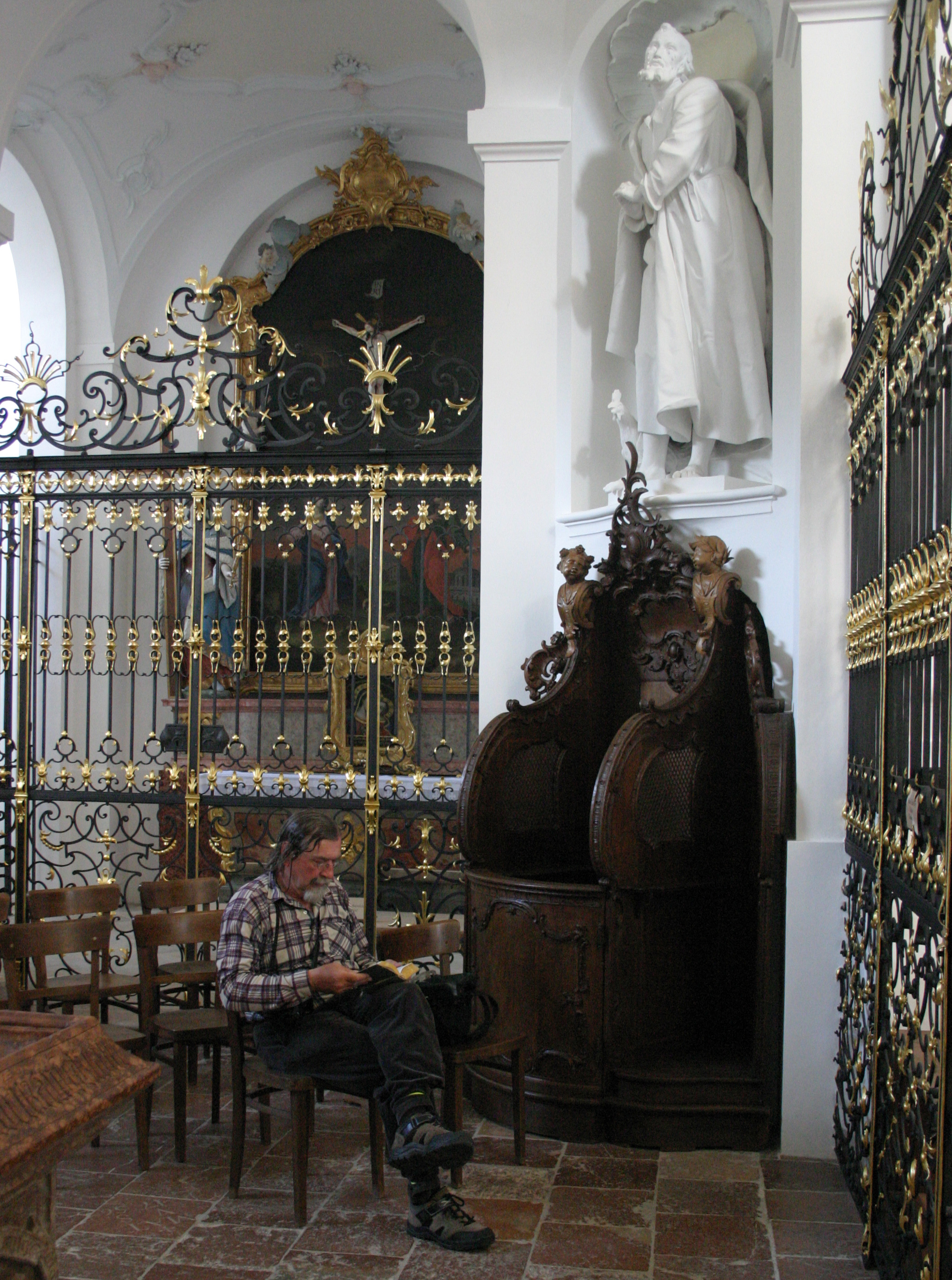

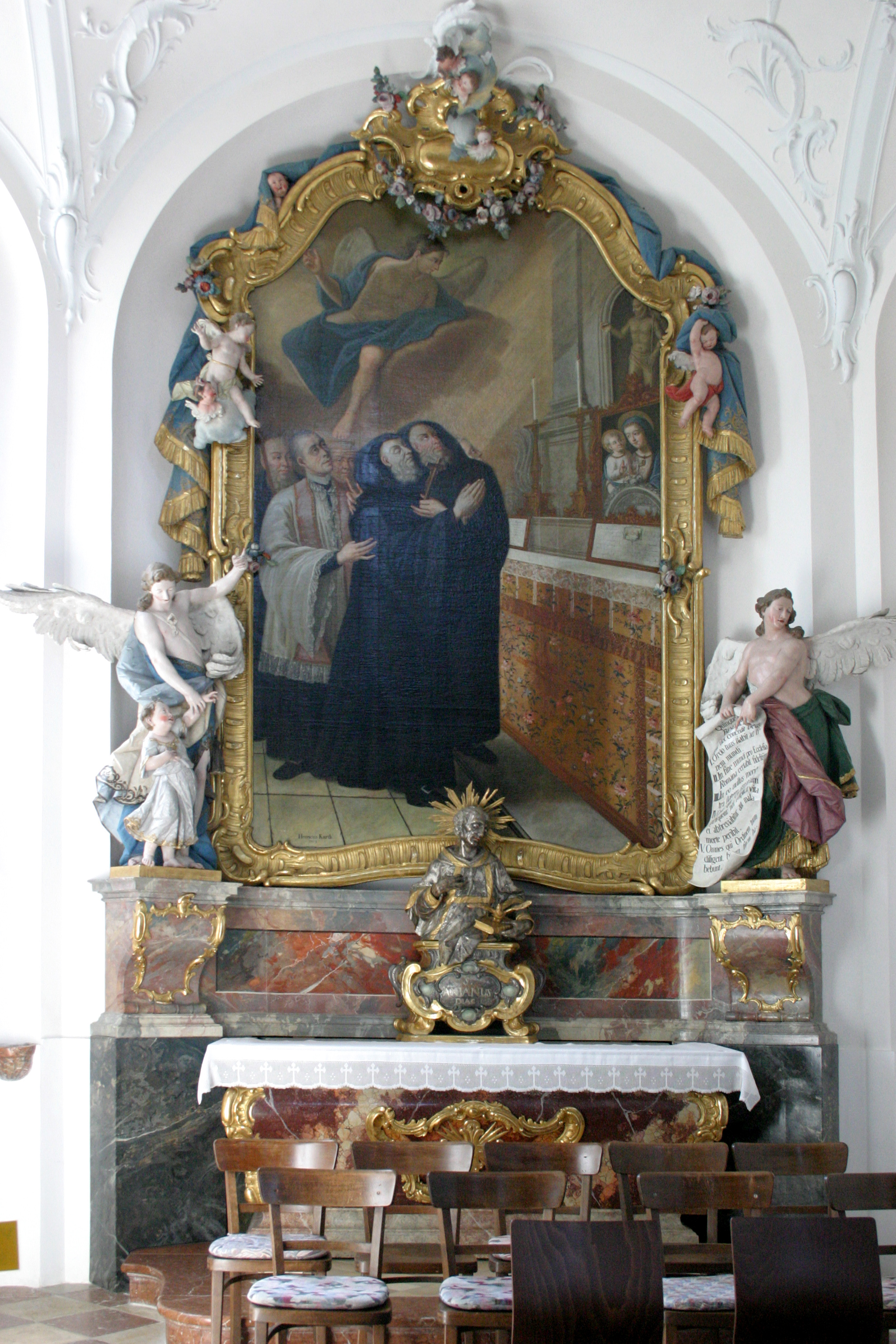

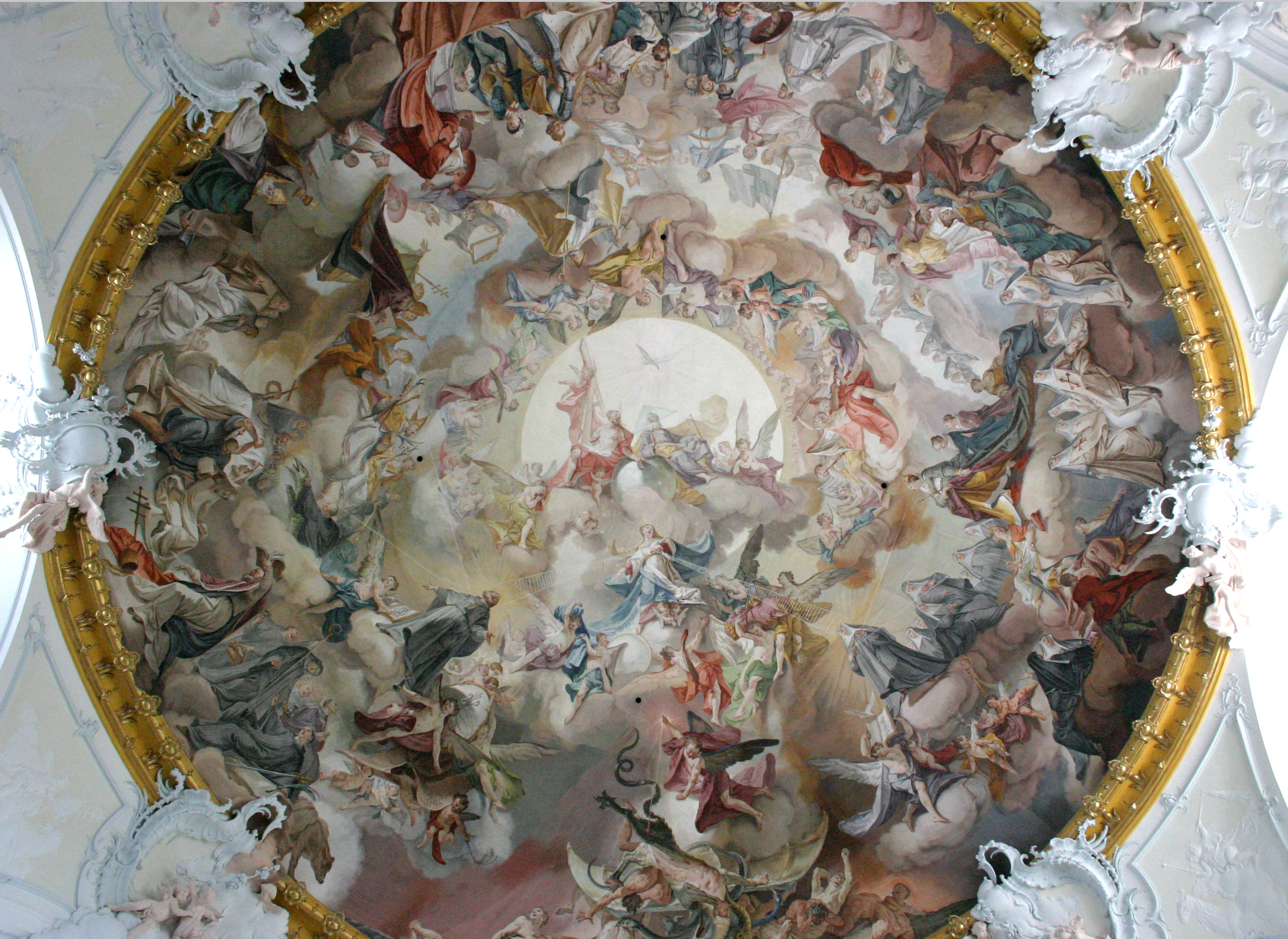

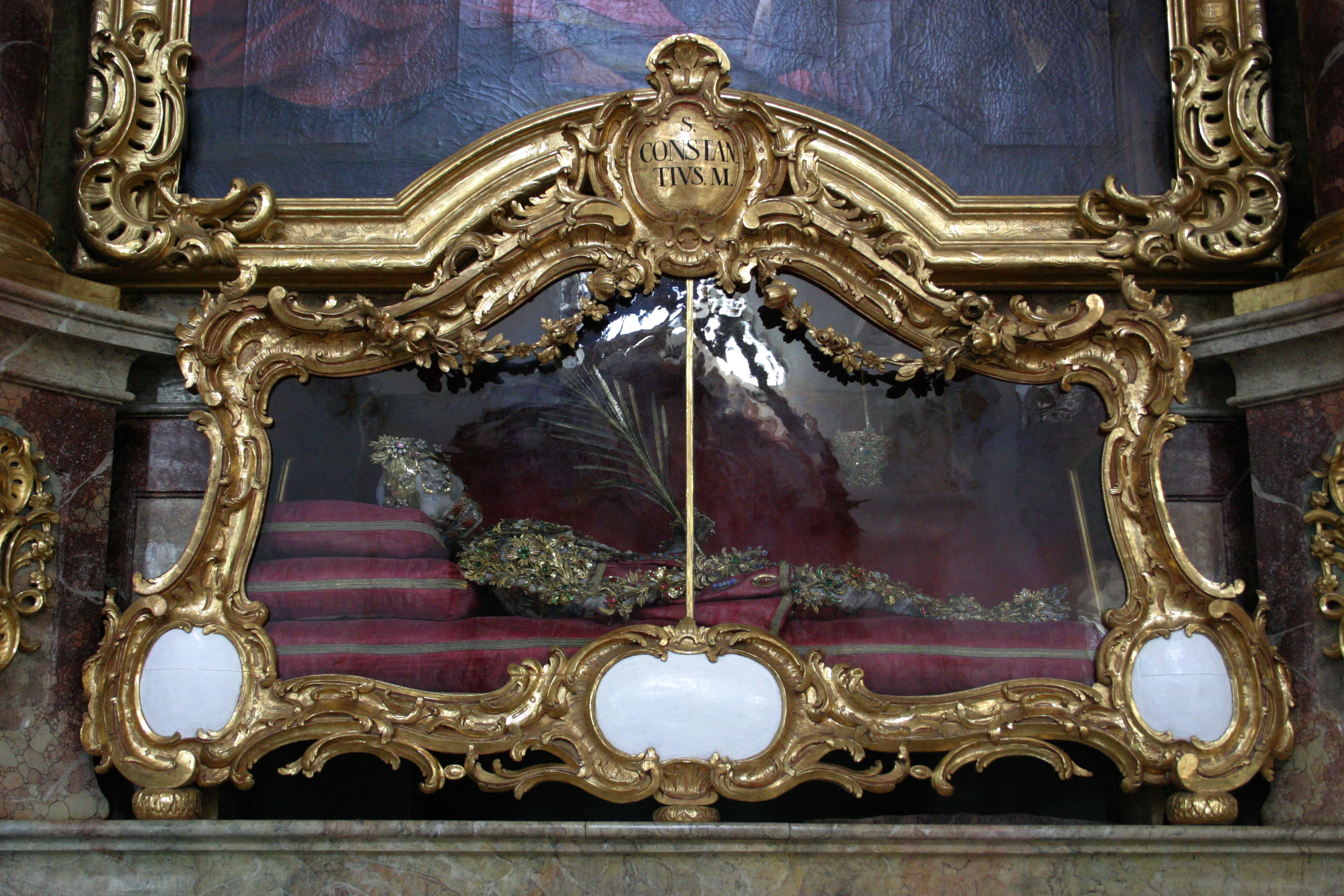

== See also ==
- 18th-century Western domes
