= Wilhelm Hauschild =

German painter (1827–1887)

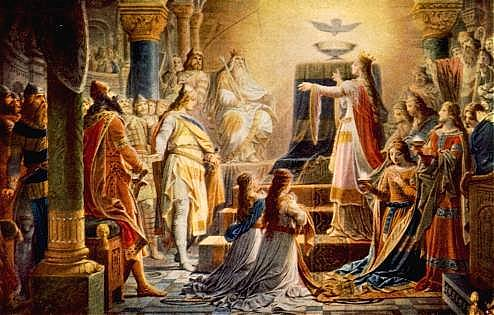
The Miracle of the Grail, mural at Neuschwanstein Castle

Assumption of Mary, ceiling painting in Lochen Church

Wilhelm Hauschild (16 November 1827 – 14 May 1887) was a German historical painter. He created murals for Neuschwanstein Castle.

== Life ==
Wilhelm Hauschild, whose father was a master weaver, completed an apprenticeship with the decorative painter Krachwitz in Frankenstein. While traveling, he came to Munich with a recommendation from the Chiemgau painter Josef Holzmaier to the history painter Josef Schlotthauer, who recognized Hauschild's talent. After he had given him the necessary knowledge to attend the Royal Academy of Art, Hauschild enrolled on April 10, 1850 for painting and became a student of Philipp Foltz.

On the recommendation of the painter Wilhelm von Kaulbach, Hauschild received an order from the Prussian King Friedrich Wilhelm IV. After he had created eight large paintings for the historical gallery of the Bavarian National Museum, he received further orders from the Bavarian royal family. For King Ludwig II he painted the ceiling pictures for the castles Linderhof and Herrenchiemsee. At Neuschwanstein Castle he was given the picturesque design of the throne room and the series of pictures from Lohengrin, Sigurd, and the Gudrunsage. During this work, Hauschild fell off a scaffold. He suffered a broken shoulder and a severe concussion. He was also involved in the design of the wall and ceiling paintings for the royal building of the Munich Residence. In 1854, he created a Petrus altar for the Church of St. Joseph in Starnberg.

Hauschild always remained connected to his Silesian homeland. For the parish church of Schlegel he created three altarpieces. For the church on the Schlegler Allerheiligenberg he painted the frescoes and the paintings for the 16 Stations of the Cross. He created the paintings Immaculate Conception and St. Petersburg for the side altars of the Lauban parish church, which was being decorated at the same time by his friend, the Munich architect Johann Marggraff.

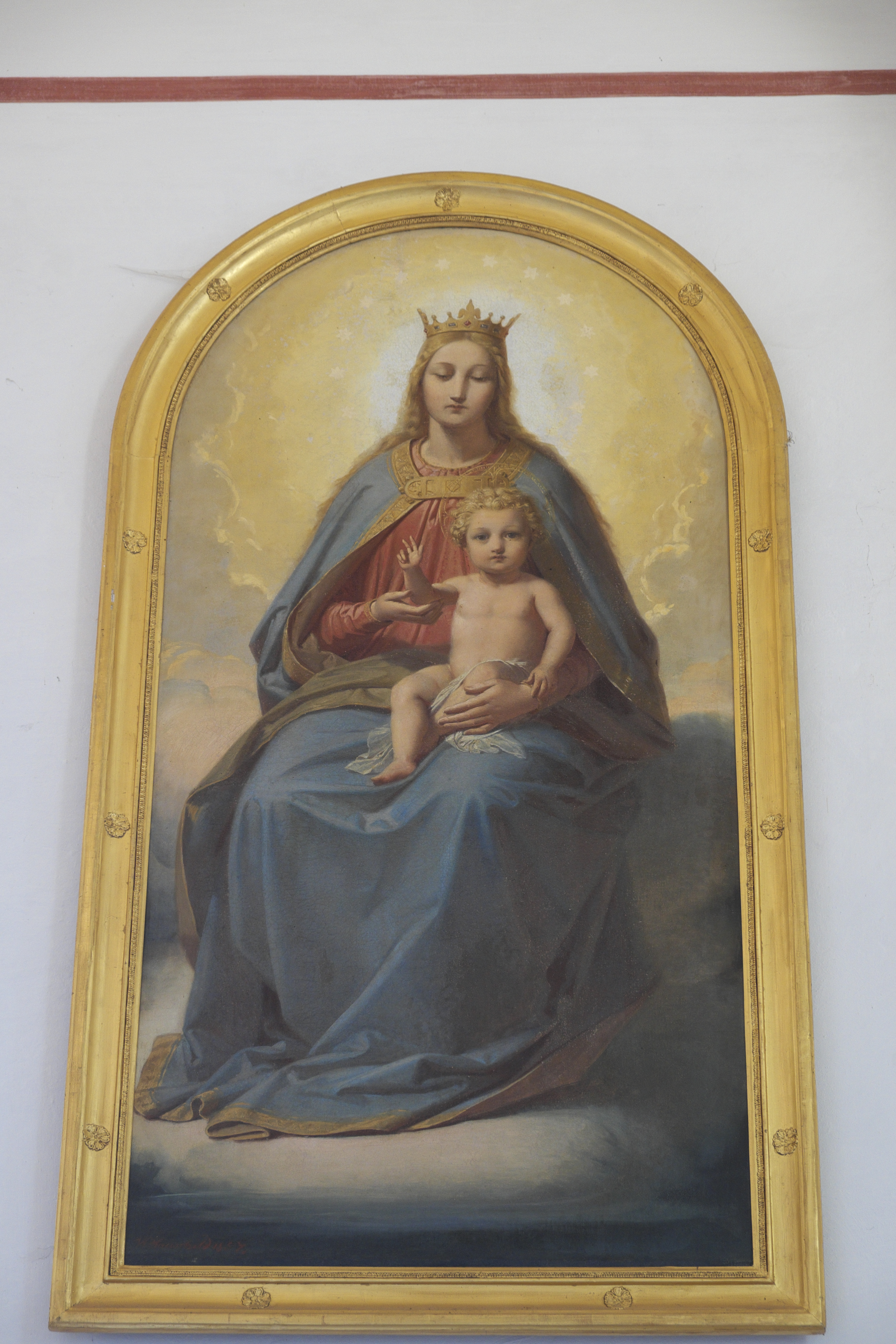
Mary and Child, St. Bartholomäus

Hauschild was a member of the Munich Association for Christian Art and in 1883 became its chairman. In 1879, King Ludwig II awarded him the title of Royal Academy Professor. Hauschild received the gold medal for art and science for his achievements. A street is named after him in Munich's Obersendling district.

== Literature ==
- Hyacinth Holland : Hauschild, Wilhelm . In Allgemeine Deutsche Biographie (ADB). Volume 50, Duncker & Humblot, Leipzig 1905, pp. 77–81.
- Association for Christian Art in Munich (ed.): Festgabe to commemorate the 50th year. Anniversary. Lentner'sche Hofbuchhandlung, Munich 1910, p. 62 f.
- Hauschild, Wilhelm . In: Hans Vollmer (Hrsg.): General lexicon of visual artists from antiquity to the present . Founded by Ulrich Thieme and Felix Becker . tape 16 : Hansen – Heubach . EA Seemann, Leipzig 1923, p. 138 .
- Joseph Wittig : Chronicle of the community Schlegel. Self-published by the home community Schlegel, Hattingen / Neuss 1983.
- Dehio -Manual of Art Monuments in Poland Silesia. Munich Berlin 2005, ISBN 3-422-03109-X , p. 554.

== Individual evidence ==
1. ↑ matrikel.adbk.de
2. ↑ http://www.koenig-ludwig-schloss-neuschwanstein.de/schloss-neuschwanstein/baugeschichte/arbeitsunfaelle-auf-der-baustelle-neuschwansteins/
