= St. Joseph's Church, Starnberg =

Rococo church

Coordinates: 47°59′49″N 11°20′17″E

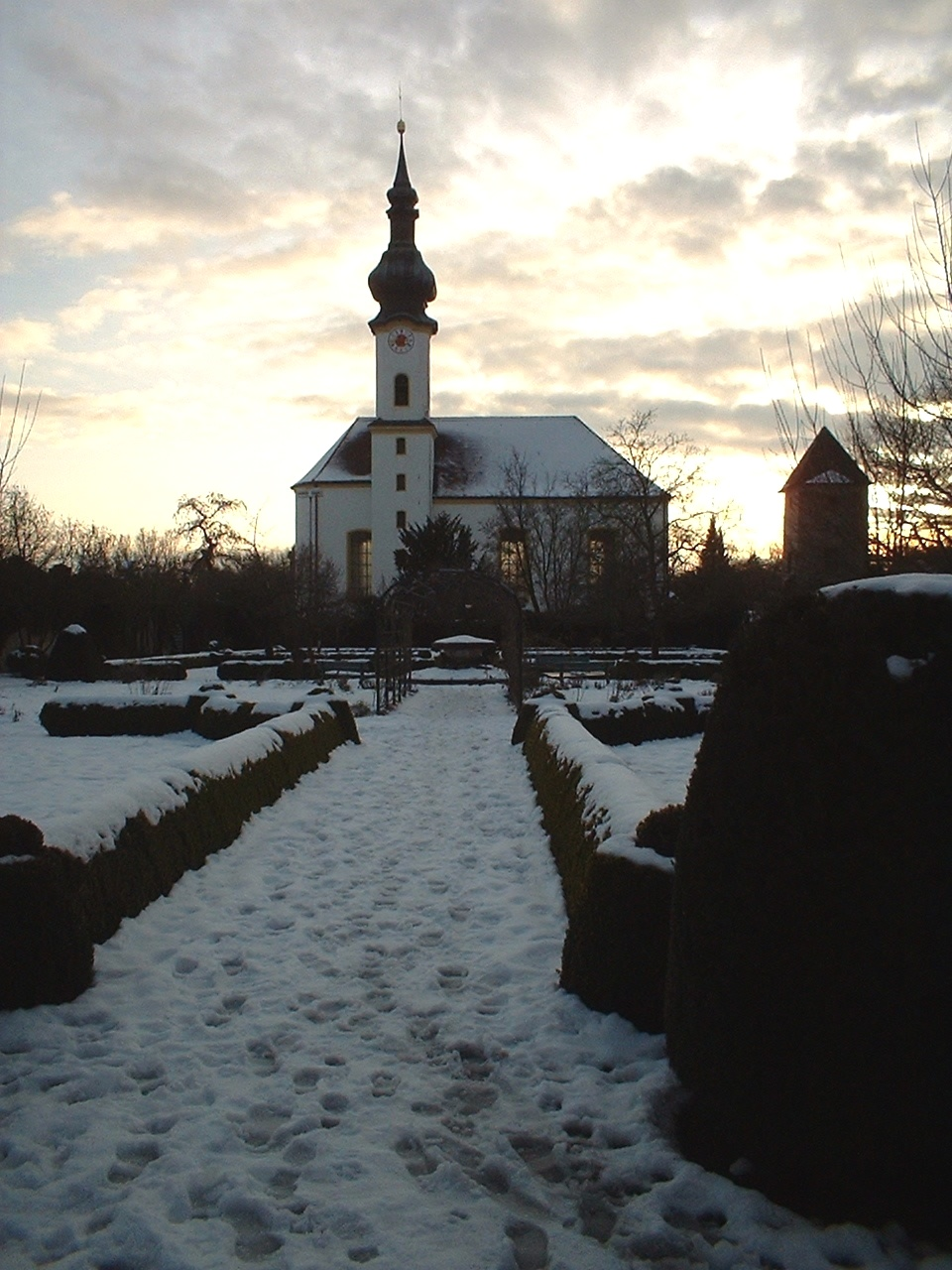
St. Joseph from the north side from the castle garden in winter

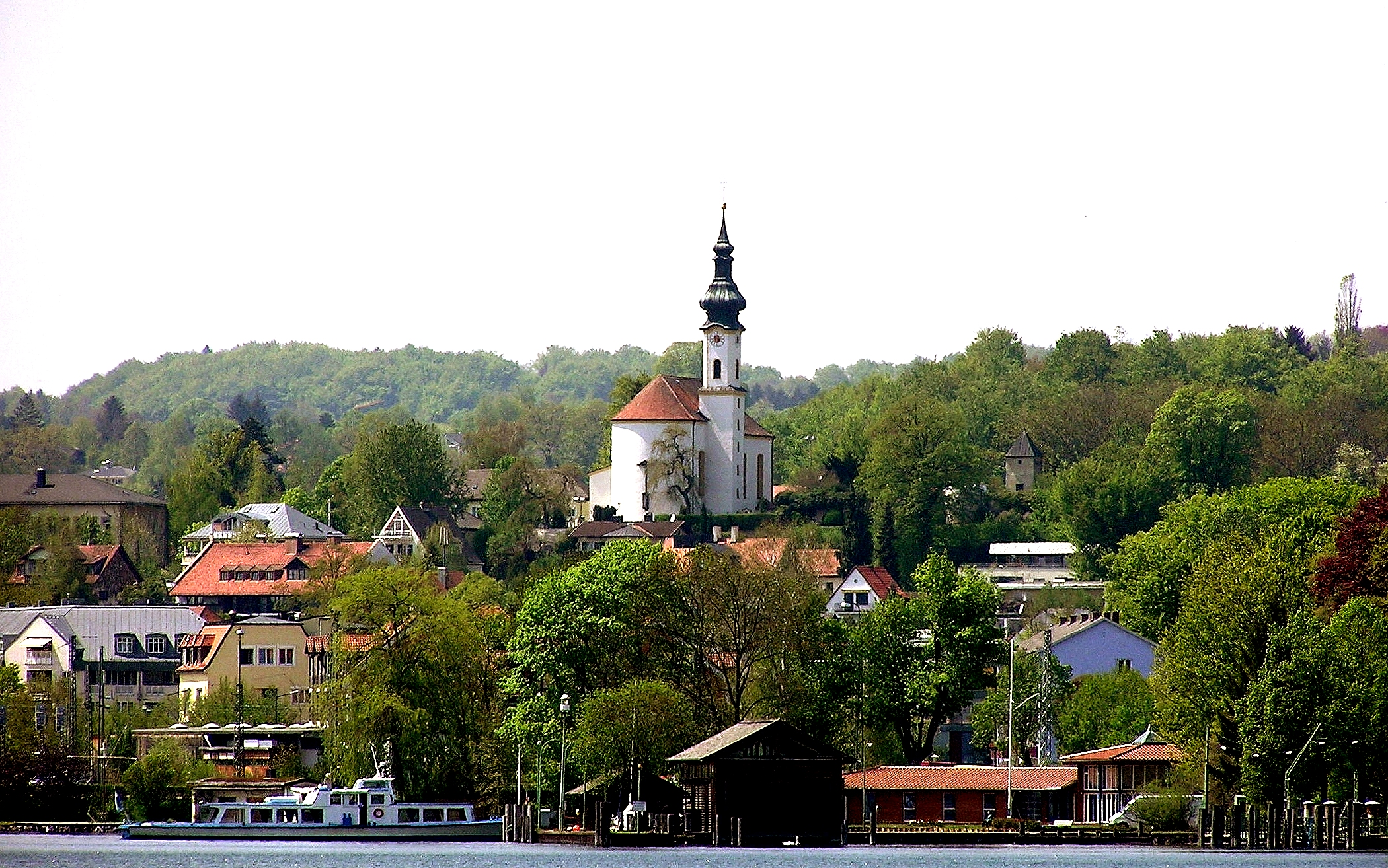
View from the lake side with the segmented arch apse, to the left of it the sacristy and to the right the church tower

St. Joseph is a Rococo church in Starnberg, Bavaria, Germany. It was built in the second half of the 18th century. The high altar of the church was created by Ignaz Günther.

== Location and naming ==
The church is located up on the hills on the west side of Starnberg. It is directly adjacent to the small castle garden that lies between it and Starnberg Castle. She has her patronage from St. Joseph, patron of Bavaria since 1764.

== Stalls and pulpit ==
The pews, the choir stalls, the confessionals, and the lower pillars of the west gallery are the work of Bartholomäus Zwinck. He created them in Murnau in 1766.

The gilded pulpit on the right pillar of the triumphal arch is also made by Zwinck. It is considered a "cabinet piece." It refers to the Evangelist John and shows his main attributes, taken from the Book of Revelation: on the pulpit the eagle, next to the pulpit the lion and man, and below the bull. The pulpit was originally made for the Elisabeth Church in Munich and was also installed there; it has only been in St. Joseph since the beginning of the 19th century.

The crucifix on the left is likely a work by Philipp Jakob Rämpl, also from the 18th century.

== Side altars ==
The side altars represent Saint Peter on the left and Saint Sebastian on the right. Both are shown with their attributes, Peter holds the key to heaven, Sebastian has an arrow in his side, corresponding to his martyrdom. They are neo-baroque works, created in 1854. The Petrus altar is by Wilhelm Hauschild, the Sebastian altar by Eduard Schwoiser.

== High altar ==
Created by Ignaz Günther, the group of the Holy Family, Mary holding the baby Jesus, Joseph on the right side around a globe, is carved from linden wood. The people next to the putti are painted white for emphasis. Except for the figures, the altar is gilded. It forms an imaginary triangle from the middle putto floating in a halo to the clouds on the left and the lying putto on the right. The lack of an altar painting is unusual, but due to the structure of this construction it was no longer necessary. The altar is accompanied by two figures also framed in white, on the left Saint John of Nepomuk and on the right Saint Francis Xavier.

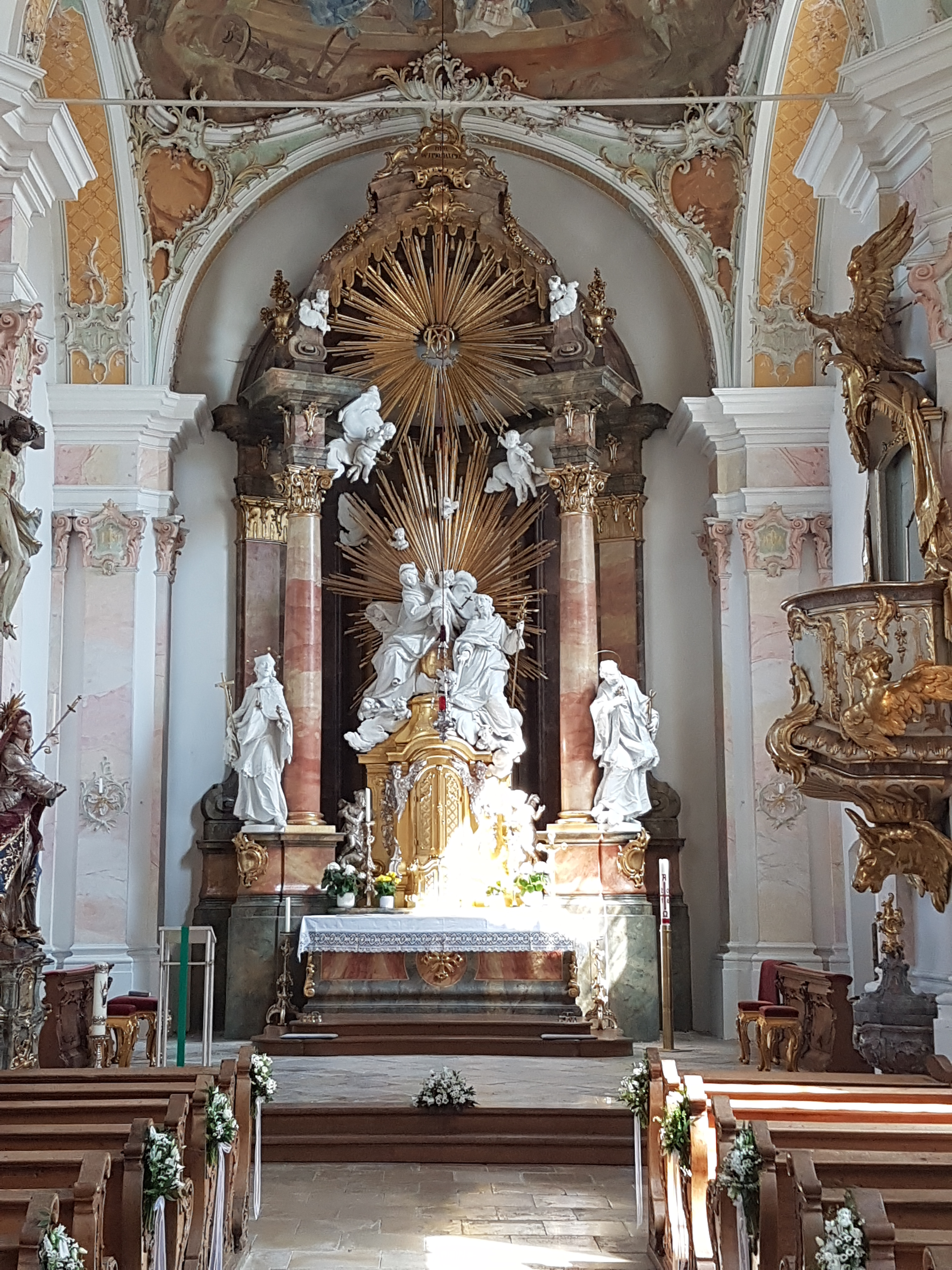
High altar by Ignaz Günther

The church as a whole was built in the Rococo, the calm stucco, the little gilding and the very restrained, pastel-colored painting show the transition to neoclassicism.

== Interior of the church ==
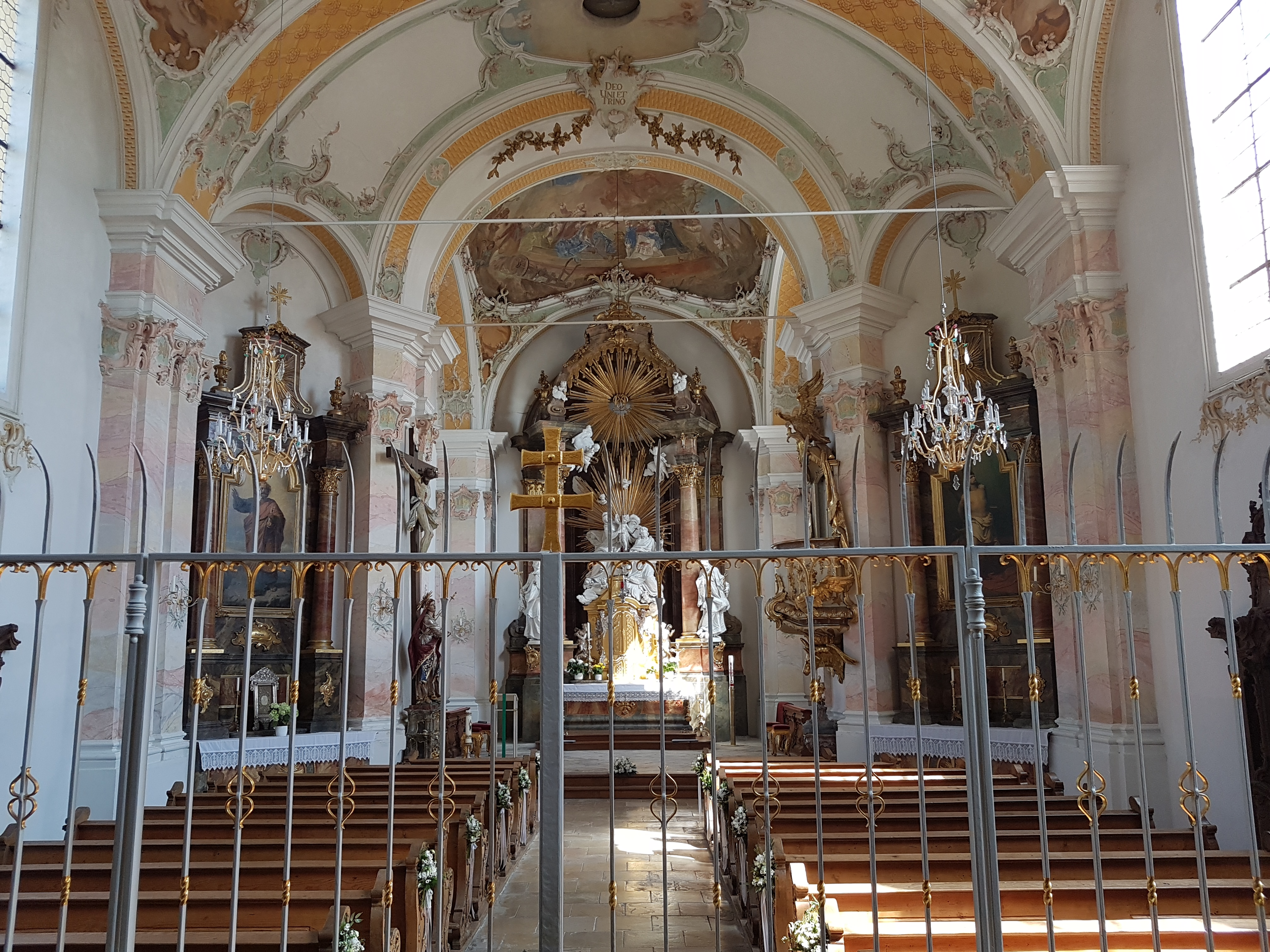
Inside with Rococo furnishings

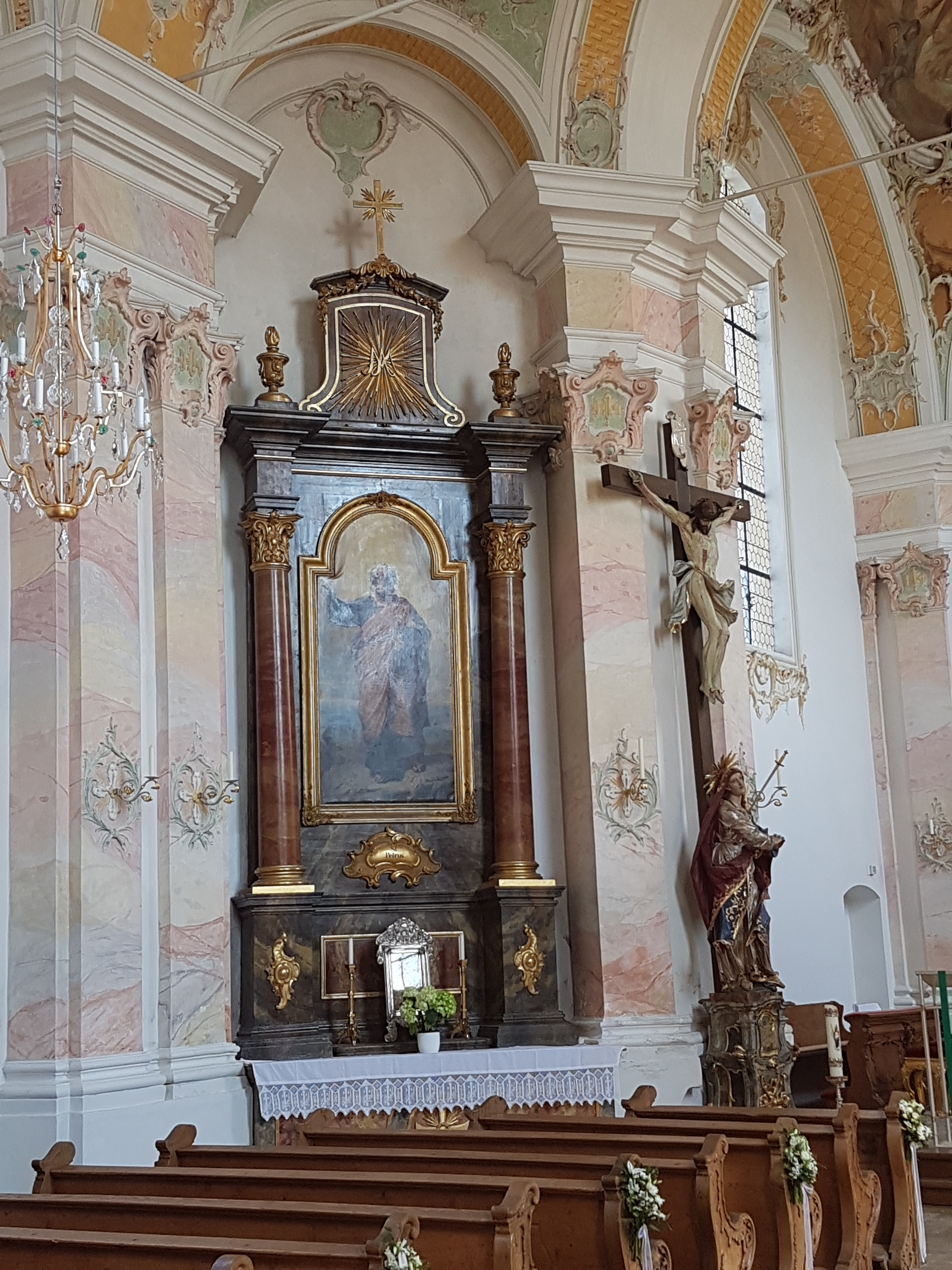
Saint Peter altar

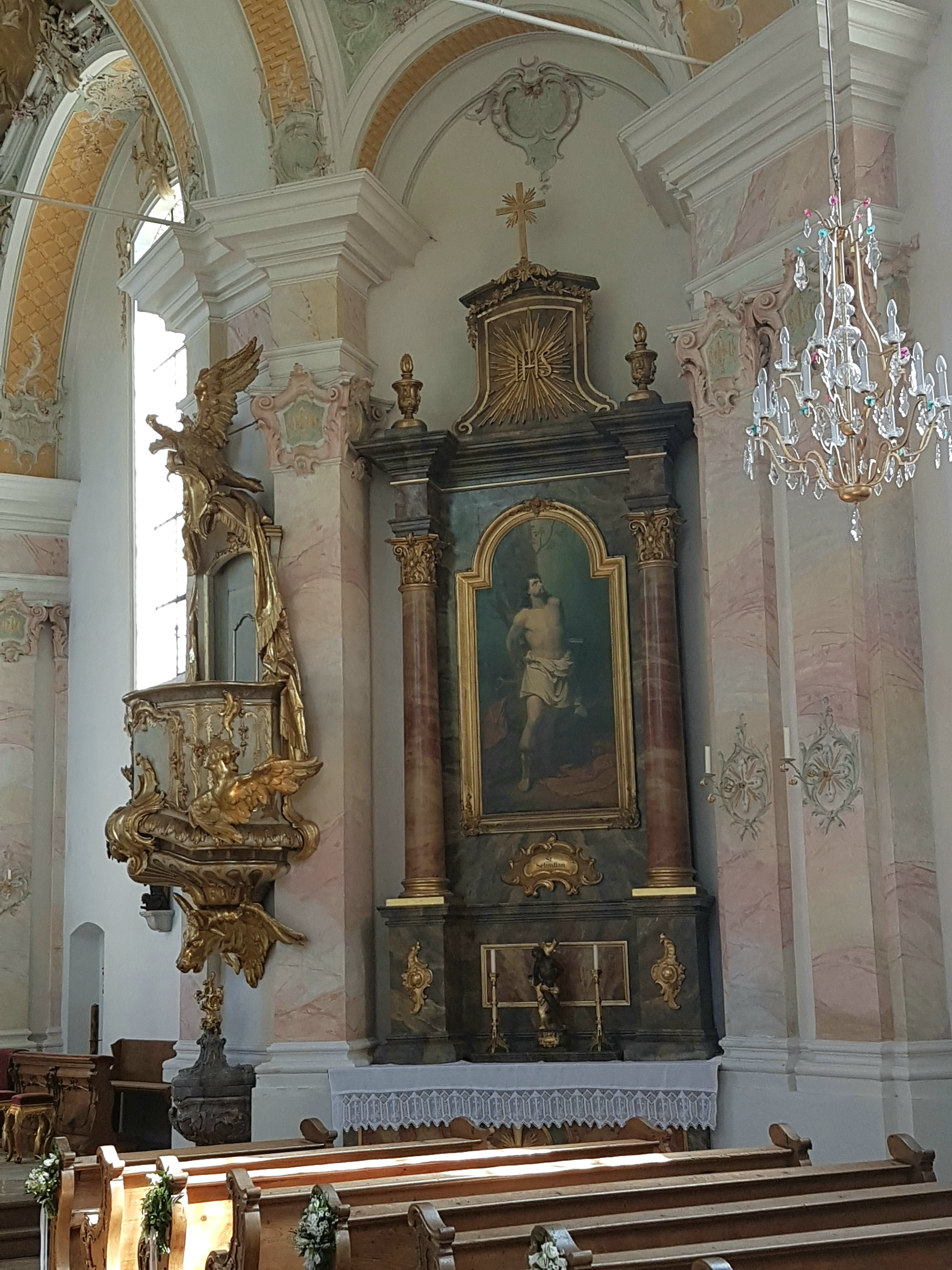
Saint Sebastian altar

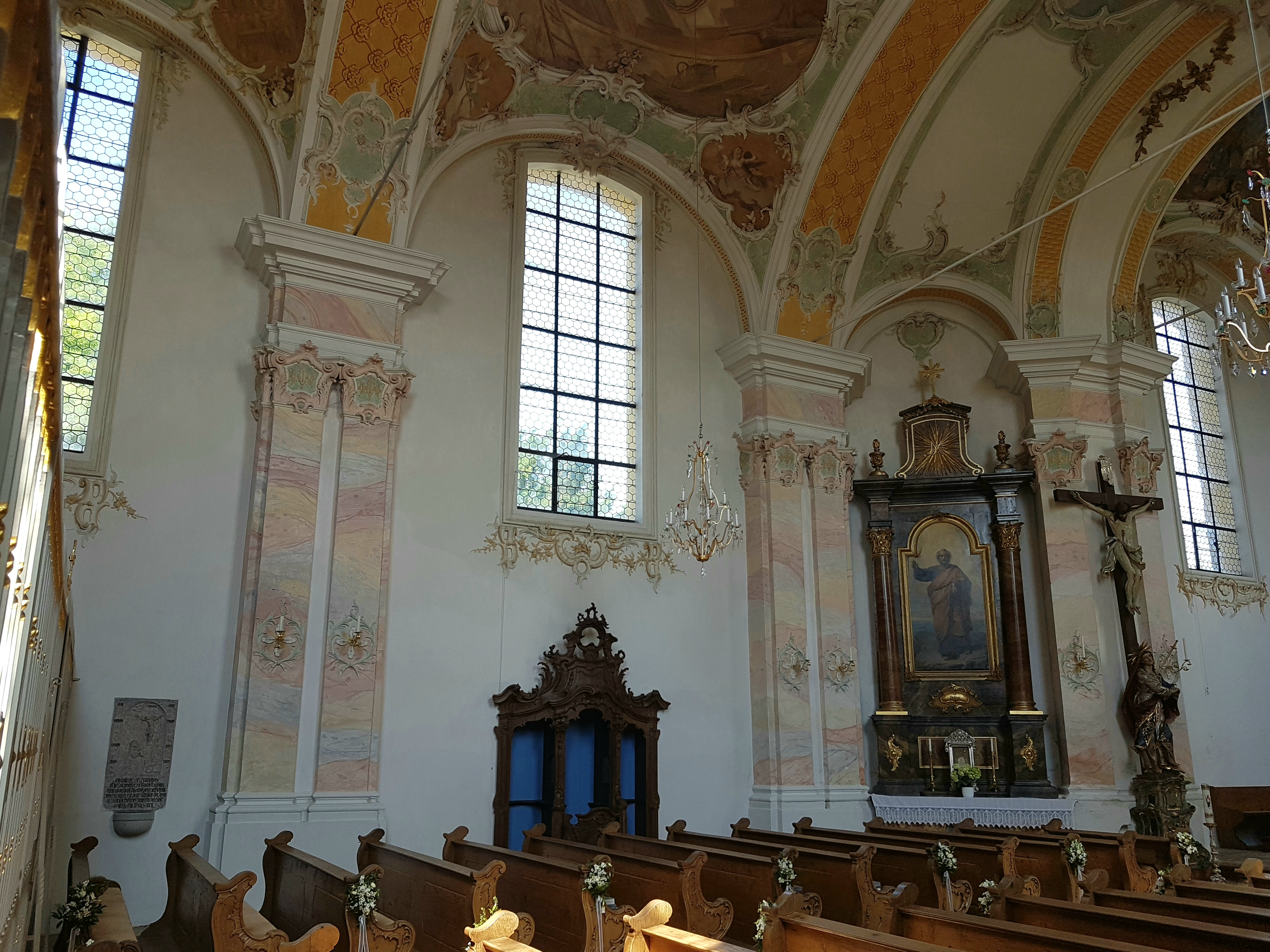
Left north side of the nave

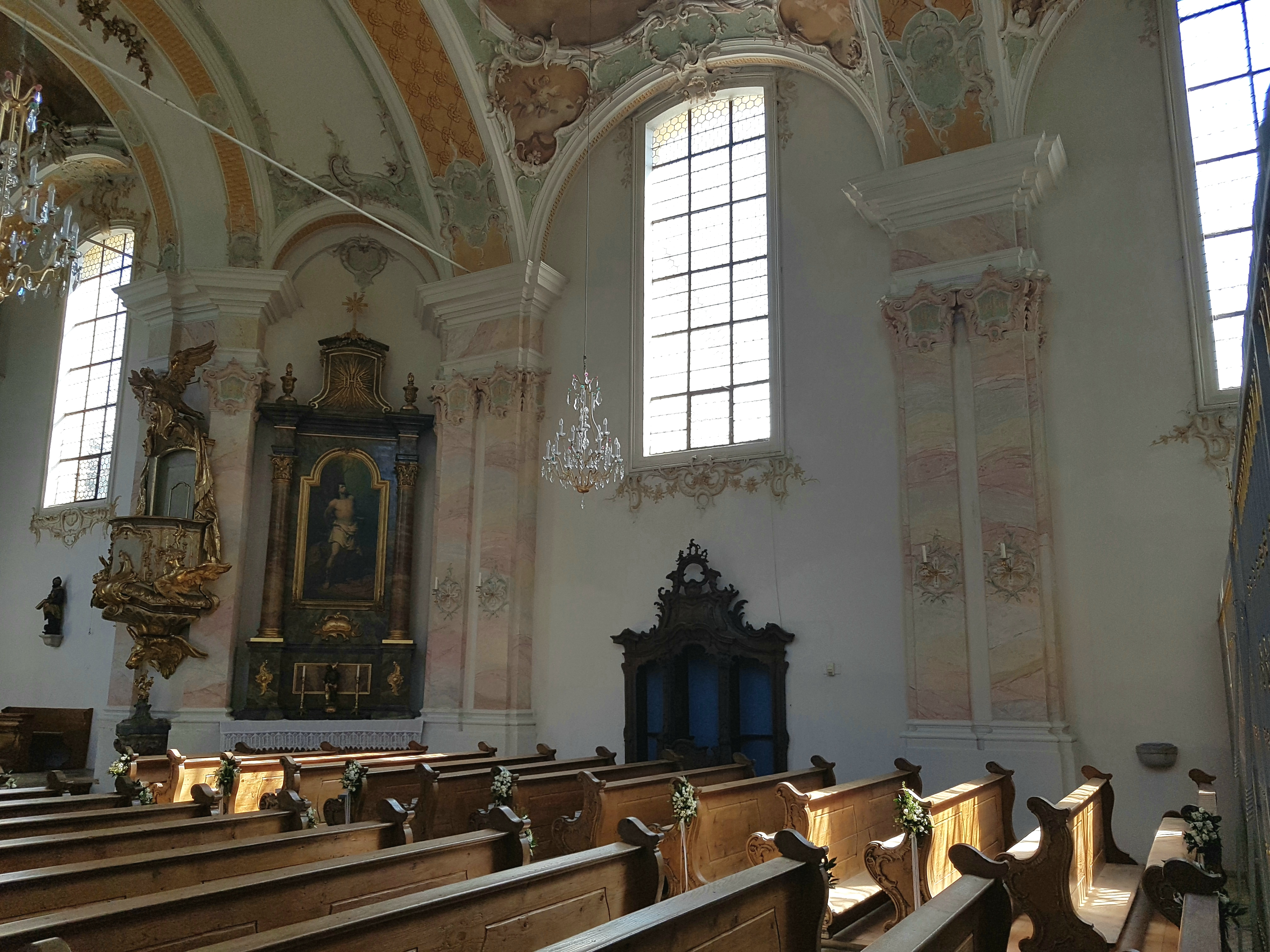
Right south side of the nave

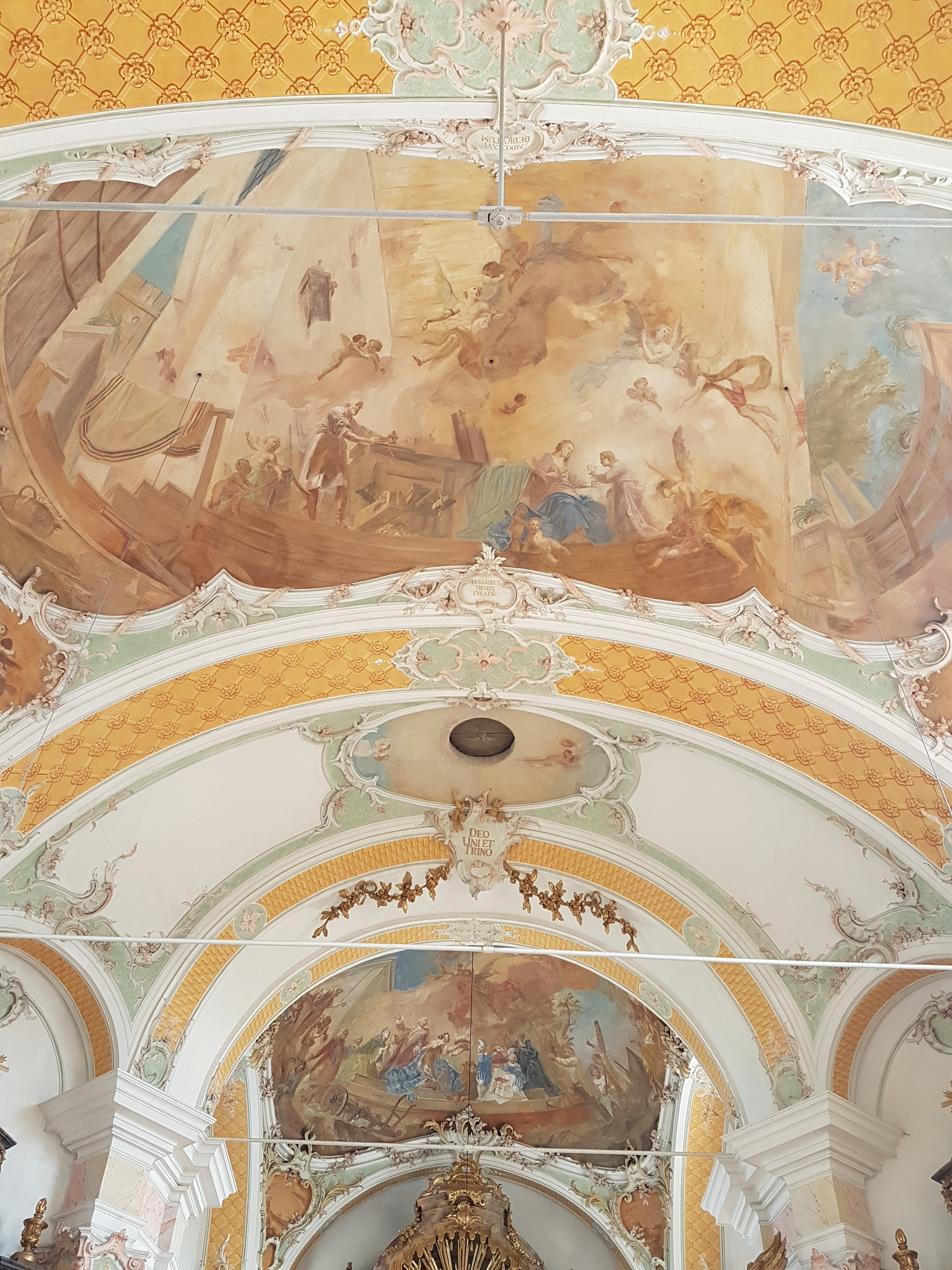
Vault frescos of the choir and nave
