= Rott am Inn (Verwaltungsgemeinschaft) =

- Verwaltungsgemeinschaft
- Location of Rott am Inn within Rosenheim district
- Interactive map of Rott am Inn
- Location within Germany Location within Bavaria
- Coordinates: 47°59′N 12°08′E
- Country: Germany
- State: Bavaria
- Admin. region: Upper Bavaria
- District: Rosenheim
- Seat: Rott am Inn
- Subdivisions: 2 municipalities

Area
  - Total: 27.66 km^{2} (10.68 sq mi)

Population (2025-12-31)
  - Total: 5,526
  - Density: 199.8/km^{2} (517.4/sq mi)
- Time zone: UTC+01:00 (CET)
  - Summer (DST): UTC+02:00 (CEST)
- Website: www.rottinn.de

Rott am Inn is a Verwaltungsgemeinschaft (municipal association) in the district of Rosenheim in Bavaria, Germany. Its seat is in Rott am Inn.

It consists of the following municipalities:

1. Ramerberg
2. Rott am Inn
