= Rott am Inn =

- Municipality
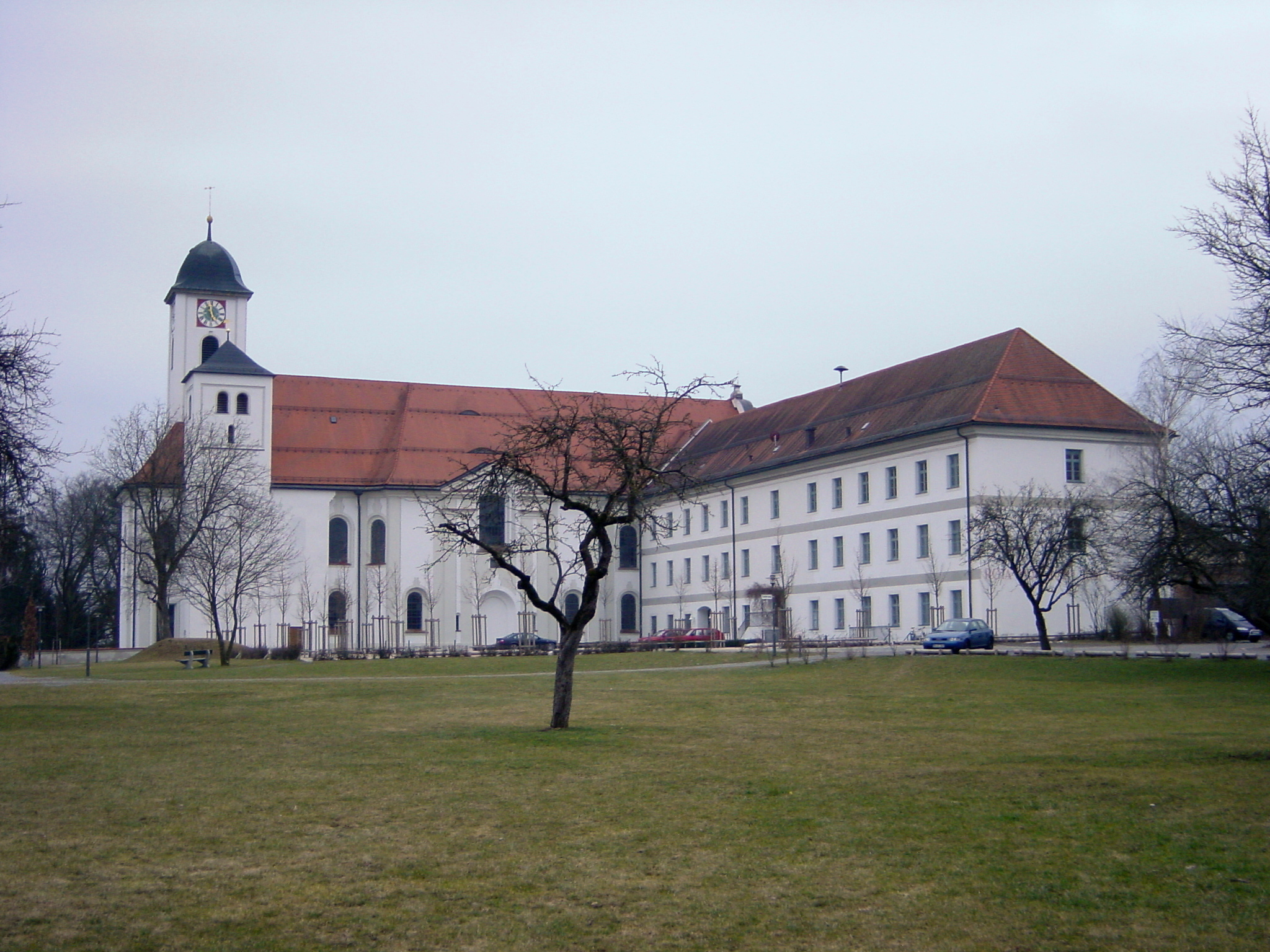
- Rott Abbey

- Coat of arms

- Location of Rott am Inn within Rosenheim district
- Interactive map of Rott am Inn
- Location within Germany Location within Bavaria
- Coordinates: 47°58′N 12°07′E
- Country: Germany
- State: Bavaria
- Admin. region: Oberbayern
- District: Rosenheim
- Municipal assoc.: Rott am Inn

Government
  - Mayor (2020–26): Daniel Wendrock

Area
  - Total: 19.57 km^{2} (7.56 sq mi)
- Elevation: 481 m (1,578 ft)

Population (2025-12-31)
  - Total: 4,104
  - Density: 209.7/km^{2} (543.1/sq mi)
- Time zone: UTC+01:00 (CET)
  - Summer (DST): UTC+02:00 (CEST)
- Postal codes: 83543
- Dialling codes: 08039
- Vehicle registration: RO
- Website: www.rottinn.net

Rott am Inn (German pronunciation: [ˈʁɔt ʔam ˈʔɪn], lit. 'Rott on the Inn') is a municipality in the district of Rosenheim in Bavaria in Germany. It lies on the river Inn.
