= Ramerberg =

- Municipality
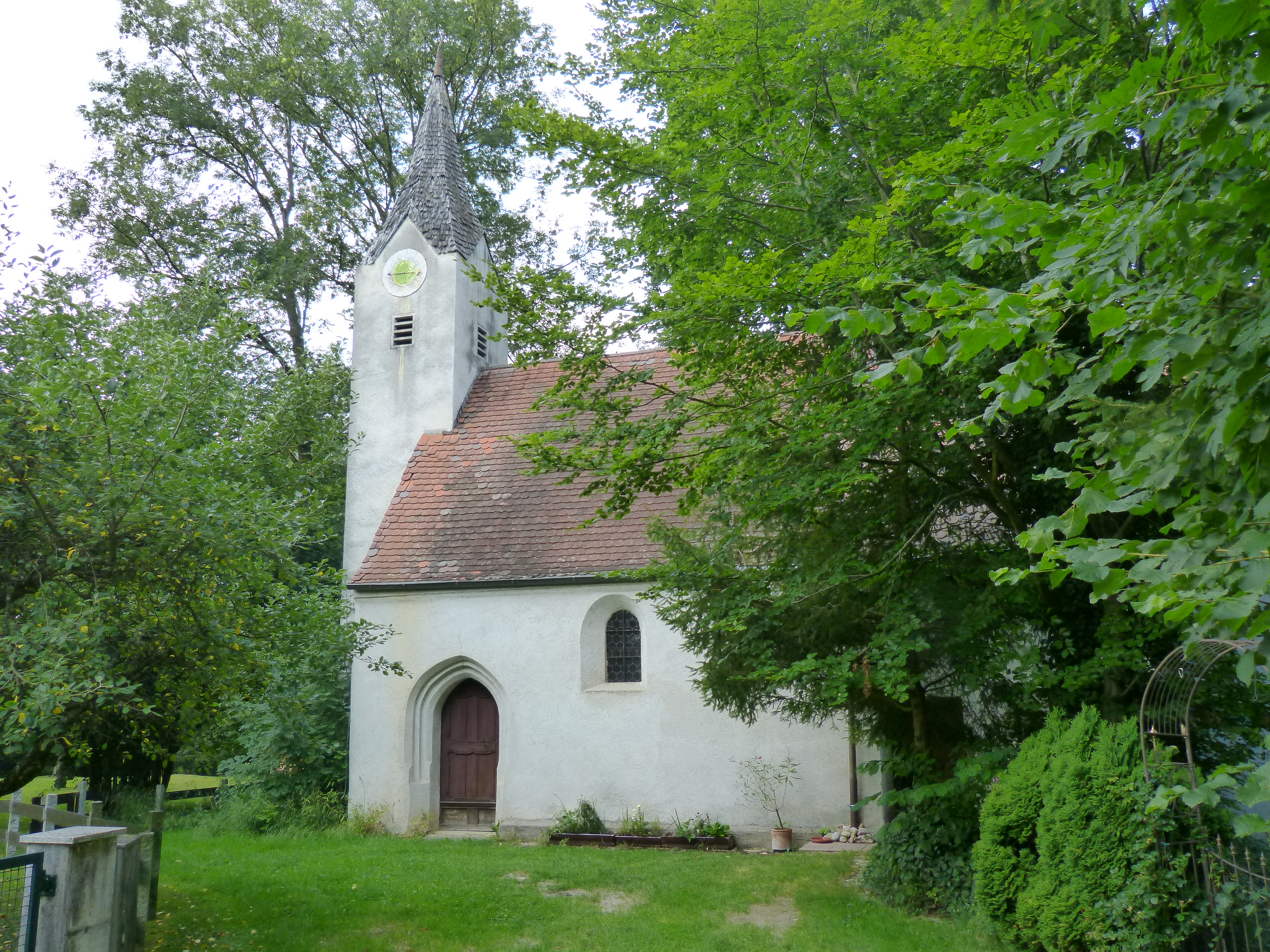
- Chapel of Saint George

- Coat of arms

- Location of Ramerberg within Rosenheim district
- Interactive map of Ramerberg
- Location within Germany Location within Bavaria
- Coordinates: 48°1′N 12°9′E
- Country: Germany
- State: Bavaria
- Admin. region: Oberbayern
- District: Rosenheim
- Municipal assoc.: Rott am Inn

Government
  - Mayor (2020–26): Manfred Reithmeier

Area
  - Total: 8.09 km^{2} (3.12 sq mi)
- Elevation: 480 m (1,570 ft)

Population (2025-12-31)
  - Total: 1,422
  - Density: 176/km^{2} (455/sq mi)
- Time zone: UTC+01:00 (CET)
  - Summer (DST): UTC+02:00 (CEST)
- Postal codes: 83561
- Dialling codes: 08039
- Vehicle registration: RO
- Website: www.ramerberg.de

Ramerberg (German pronunciation: [ˈʁaːmɐbɛʁk]) is a municipality in the district of Rosenheim in Bavaria in Germany. It lies on the river Inn, which receives its tributary the Attel from the left near Ramerberg.
