= Attel =

River in Germany

- The Attel near Aßling

- Location of mouth in Bavaria

Location
- Country: Germany
- State: Bavaria

Physical characteristics
- Mouth
  - location: Inn
  - coordinates: 48.0221°N 12.1774°E
- Length: 39.6 km (24.6 mi)
- Basin size: 331 km^{2} (128 sq mi)

Basin features
- Progression: Inn→ Danube→ Black Sea

The Attel (German pronunciation: [ˈatl̩]) is a river in Bavaria, Germany. It is a left tributary of the Inn, into which it flows from the left near Ramerberg.

== See also ==
- List of rivers of Bavaria
